

316001–316100 

|-bgcolor=#fefefe
| 316001 ||  || — || March 15, 2009 || La Sagra || OAM Obs. || FLO || align=right data-sort-value="0.78" | 780 m || 
|-id=002 bgcolor=#fefefe
| 316002 ||  || — || March 15, 2009 || Catalina || CSS || — || align=right data-sort-value="0.90" | 900 m || 
|-id=003 bgcolor=#fefefe
| 316003 ||  || — || March 15, 2009 || Kitt Peak || Spacewatch || — || align=right data-sort-value="0.63" | 630 m || 
|-id=004 bgcolor=#fefefe
| 316004 ||  || — || March 15, 2009 || Kitt Peak || Spacewatch || — || align=right data-sort-value="0.68" | 680 m || 
|-id=005 bgcolor=#fefefe
| 316005 ||  || — || March 15, 2009 || La Sagra || OAM Obs. || — || align=right data-sort-value="0.99" | 990 m || 
|-id=006 bgcolor=#fefefe
| 316006 ||  || — || March 2, 2009 || Mount Lemmon || Mount Lemmon Survey || FLO || align=right data-sort-value="0.72" | 720 m || 
|-id=007 bgcolor=#fefefe
| 316007 ||  || — || March 7, 2009 || Mount Lemmon || Mount Lemmon Survey || NYS || align=right data-sort-value="0.71" | 710 m || 
|-id=008 bgcolor=#fefefe
| 316008 ||  || — || March 16, 2009 || La Sagra || OAM Obs. || — || align=right | 1.1 km || 
|-id=009 bgcolor=#fefefe
| 316009 ||  || — || March 18, 2009 || Mayhill || A. Lowe || — || align=right data-sort-value="0.74" | 740 m || 
|-id=010 bgcolor=#fefefe
| 316010 Daviddubey ||  ||  || March 19, 2009 || Mayhill || N. Falla || — || align=right data-sort-value="0.75" | 750 m || 
|-id=011 bgcolor=#fefefe
| 316011 ||  || — || March 17, 2009 || Kitt Peak || Spacewatch || FLO || align=right data-sort-value="0.78" | 780 m || 
|-id=012 bgcolor=#fefefe
| 316012 ||  || — || March 16, 2009 || La Sagra || OAM Obs. || — || align=right data-sort-value="0.88" | 880 m || 
|-id=013 bgcolor=#fefefe
| 316013 ||  || — || March 17, 2009 || La Sagra || OAM Obs. || V || align=right data-sort-value="0.69" | 690 m || 
|-id=014 bgcolor=#fefefe
| 316014 ||  || — || March 19, 2009 || Hibiscus || N. Teamo || FLO || align=right data-sort-value="0.61" | 610 m || 
|-id=015 bgcolor=#fefefe
| 316015 ||  || — || March 19, 2009 || Mount Lemmon || Mount Lemmon Survey || FLO || align=right data-sort-value="0.82" | 820 m || 
|-id=016 bgcolor=#fefefe
| 316016 ||  || — || March 22, 2009 || Vicques || M. Ory || — || align=right data-sort-value="0.73" | 730 m || 
|-id=017 bgcolor=#fefefe
| 316017 ||  || — || March 19, 2009 || Kitt Peak || Spacewatch || — || align=right | 1.0 km || 
|-id=018 bgcolor=#fefefe
| 316018 ||  || — || March 19, 2009 || La Sagra || OAM Obs. || — || align=right data-sort-value="0.84" | 840 m || 
|-id=019 bgcolor=#fefefe
| 316019 ||  || — || March 22, 2009 || La Sagra || OAM Obs. || FLO || align=right data-sort-value="0.78" | 780 m || 
|-id=020 bgcolor=#fefefe
| 316020 Linshuhow ||  ||  || March 21, 2009 || Lulin Observatory || Y.-S. Tsai, T. Chen || — || align=right data-sort-value="0.73" | 730 m || 
|-id=021 bgcolor=#fefefe
| 316021 ||  || — || March 25, 2009 || Sierra Stars || F. Tozzi || — || align=right | 1.1 km || 
|-id=022 bgcolor=#fefefe
| 316022 ||  || — || March 26, 2009 || Mount Lemmon || Mount Lemmon Survey || — || align=right data-sort-value="0.63" | 630 m || 
|-id=023 bgcolor=#fefefe
| 316023 ||  || — || March 24, 2009 || Mount Lemmon || Mount Lemmon Survey || — || align=right data-sort-value="0.84" | 840 m || 
|-id=024 bgcolor=#fefefe
| 316024 ||  || — || March 21, 2009 || Catalina || CSS || — || align=right data-sort-value="0.92" | 920 m || 
|-id=025 bgcolor=#fefefe
| 316025 ||  || — || March 26, 2009 || Mount Lemmon || Mount Lemmon Survey || — || align=right data-sort-value="0.78" | 780 m || 
|-id=026 bgcolor=#fefefe
| 316026 ||  || — || March 28, 2009 || Kitt Peak || Spacewatch || V || align=right data-sort-value="0.63" | 630 m || 
|-id=027 bgcolor=#fefefe
| 316027 ||  || — || March 27, 2009 || Kitt Peak || Spacewatch || — || align=right data-sort-value="0.91" | 910 m || 
|-id=028 bgcolor=#fefefe
| 316028 Patrickwils ||  ||  || March 31, 2009 || Uccle || P. De Cat || — || align=right data-sort-value="0.89" | 890 m || 
|-id=029 bgcolor=#fefefe
| 316029 ||  || — || March 28, 2009 || Kitt Peak || Spacewatch || MAS || align=right data-sort-value="0.89" | 890 m || 
|-id=030 bgcolor=#fefefe
| 316030 ||  || — || March 28, 2009 || Kitt Peak || Spacewatch || — || align=right | 1.0 km || 
|-id=031 bgcolor=#fefefe
| 316031 ||  || — || March 24, 2009 || Mount Lemmon || Mount Lemmon Survey || — || align=right | 1.1 km || 
|-id=032 bgcolor=#fefefe
| 316032 ||  || — || March 29, 2009 || Mount Lemmon || Mount Lemmon Survey || — || align=right data-sort-value="0.96" | 960 m || 
|-id=033 bgcolor=#fefefe
| 316033 ||  || — || March 29, 2009 || Kitt Peak || Spacewatch || — || align=right data-sort-value="0.89" | 890 m || 
|-id=034 bgcolor=#fefefe
| 316034 ||  || — || March 19, 2009 || Mount Lemmon || Mount Lemmon Survey || — || align=right data-sort-value="0.77" | 770 m || 
|-id=035 bgcolor=#fefefe
| 316035 ||  || — || October 18, 2007 || Kitt Peak || Spacewatch || — || align=right data-sort-value="0.70" | 700 m || 
|-id=036 bgcolor=#fefefe
| 316036 ||  || — || March 16, 2009 || Kitt Peak || Spacewatch || EUT || align=right data-sort-value="0.66" | 660 m || 
|-id=037 bgcolor=#fefefe
| 316037 ||  || — || March 31, 2009 || Mount Lemmon || Mount Lemmon Survey || — || align=right | 1.0 km || 
|-id=038 bgcolor=#fefefe
| 316038 ||  || — || March 26, 2009 || Kitt Peak || Spacewatch || MAS || align=right data-sort-value="0.68" | 680 m || 
|-id=039 bgcolor=#fefefe
| 316039 ||  || — || April 14, 2009 || Vicques || M. Ory || — || align=right data-sort-value="0.83" | 830 m || 
|-id=040 bgcolor=#fefefe
| 316040 || 2009 HX || — || April 16, 2009 || Catalina || CSS || NYS || align=right data-sort-value="0.68" | 680 m || 
|-id=041 bgcolor=#fefefe
| 316041 ||  || — || April 17, 2009 || Kitt Peak || Spacewatch || FLO || align=right data-sort-value="0.66" | 660 m || 
|-id=042 bgcolor=#fefefe
| 316042 Tilofranz ||  ||  || April 19, 2009 || Tzec Maun || E. Schwab || ERI || align=right | 1.5 km || 
|-id=043 bgcolor=#fefefe
| 316043 ||  || — || April 16, 2009 || Catalina || CSS || NYS || align=right data-sort-value="0.71" | 710 m || 
|-id=044 bgcolor=#fefefe
| 316044 ||  || — || April 17, 2009 || Kitt Peak || Spacewatch || FLO || align=right data-sort-value="0.66" | 660 m || 
|-id=045 bgcolor=#fefefe
| 316045 ||  || — || April 17, 2009 || Kitt Peak || Spacewatch || — || align=right data-sort-value="0.74" | 740 m || 
|-id=046 bgcolor=#fefefe
| 316046 ||  || — || April 18, 2009 || Kitt Peak || Spacewatch || FLO || align=right data-sort-value="0.72" | 720 m || 
|-id=047 bgcolor=#fefefe
| 316047 ||  || — || April 17, 2009 || Catalina || CSS || FLO || align=right data-sort-value="0.83" | 830 m || 
|-id=048 bgcolor=#fefefe
| 316048 ||  || — || April 20, 2009 || Kitt Peak || Spacewatch || — || align=right data-sort-value="0.71" | 710 m || 
|-id=049 bgcolor=#fefefe
| 316049 ||  || — || April 20, 2009 || Kitt Peak || Spacewatch || — || align=right data-sort-value="0.89" | 890 m || 
|-id=050 bgcolor=#fefefe
| 316050 ||  || — || April 21, 2009 || La Sagra || OAM Obs. || — || align=right data-sort-value="0.74" | 740 m || 
|-id=051 bgcolor=#fefefe
| 316051 ||  || — || April 21, 2009 || La Sagra || OAM Obs. || EUT || align=right data-sort-value="0.68" | 680 m || 
|-id=052 bgcolor=#fefefe
| 316052 ||  || — || April 17, 2009 || Catalina || CSS || — || align=right data-sort-value="0.86" | 860 m || 
|-id=053 bgcolor=#E9E9E9
| 316053 ||  || — || April 19, 2009 || Catalina || CSS || — || align=right | 3.2 km || 
|-id=054 bgcolor=#fefefe
| 316054 ||  || — || April 20, 2009 || Kitt Peak || Spacewatch || — || align=right | 1.0 km || 
|-id=055 bgcolor=#fefefe
| 316055 ||  || — || April 22, 2009 || Kitt Peak || Spacewatch || FLO || align=right data-sort-value="0.66" | 660 m || 
|-id=056 bgcolor=#fefefe
| 316056 ||  || — || April 24, 2009 || Tzec Maun || S. Karge || V || align=right data-sort-value="0.88" | 880 m || 
|-id=057 bgcolor=#fefefe
| 316057 ||  || — || August 28, 2006 || Catalina || CSS || — || align=right data-sort-value="0.87" | 870 m || 
|-id=058 bgcolor=#fefefe
| 316058 ||  || — || April 20, 2009 || Mount Lemmon || Mount Lemmon Survey || — || align=right data-sort-value="0.74" | 740 m || 
|-id=059 bgcolor=#fefefe
| 316059 ||  || — || April 22, 2009 || Kitt Peak || Spacewatch || MAS || align=right data-sort-value="0.72" | 720 m || 
|-id=060 bgcolor=#E9E9E9
| 316060 ||  || — || November 23, 2006 || Mount Lemmon || Mount Lemmon Survey || — || align=right | 2.2 km || 
|-id=061 bgcolor=#fefefe
| 316061 ||  || — || April 28, 2009 || Catalina || CSS || — || align=right data-sort-value="0.80" | 800 m || 
|-id=062 bgcolor=#fefefe
| 316062 ||  || — || April 23, 2009 || La Sagra || OAM Obs. || NYS || align=right data-sort-value="0.66" | 660 m || 
|-id=063 bgcolor=#fefefe
| 316063 ||  || — || April 23, 2009 || La Sagra || OAM Obs. || — || align=right data-sort-value="0.89" | 890 m || 
|-id=064 bgcolor=#E9E9E9
| 316064 ||  || — || April 27, 2009 || Purple Mountain || PMO NEO || BRG || align=right | 2.1 km || 
|-id=065 bgcolor=#fefefe
| 316065 ||  || — || April 28, 2009 || Catalina || CSS || V || align=right data-sort-value="0.77" | 770 m || 
|-id=066 bgcolor=#fefefe
| 316066 ||  || — || April 26, 2009 || Siding Spring || SSS || — || align=right data-sort-value="0.88" | 880 m || 
|-id=067 bgcolor=#fefefe
| 316067 ||  || — || April 27, 2009 || Kitt Peak || Spacewatch || — || align=right data-sort-value="0.68" | 680 m || 
|-id=068 bgcolor=#fefefe
| 316068 ||  || — || April 28, 2009 || Cerro Burek || Alianza S4 Obs. || — || align=right data-sort-value="0.94" | 940 m || 
|-id=069 bgcolor=#fefefe
| 316069 ||  || — || April 20, 2009 || Kitt Peak || Spacewatch || — || align=right data-sort-value="0.70" | 700 m || 
|-id=070 bgcolor=#fefefe
| 316070 ||  || — || April 28, 2009 || Mount Lemmon || Mount Lemmon Survey || MAS || align=right data-sort-value="0.75" | 750 m || 
|-id=071 bgcolor=#fefefe
| 316071 ||  || — || April 21, 2009 || Kitt Peak || Spacewatch || V || align=right data-sort-value="0.74" | 740 m || 
|-id=072 bgcolor=#fefefe
| 316072 ||  || — || April 22, 2009 || Mount Lemmon || Mount Lemmon Survey || NYS || align=right data-sort-value="0.61" | 610 m || 
|-id=073 bgcolor=#E9E9E9
| 316073 ||  || — || April 18, 2009 || Kitt Peak || Spacewatch || MAR || align=right | 1.4 km || 
|-id=074 bgcolor=#fefefe
| 316074 ||  || — || April 24, 2009 || Mount Lemmon || Mount Lemmon Survey || ERI || align=right | 1.8 km || 
|-id=075 bgcolor=#fefefe
| 316075 ||  || — || May 13, 2009 || Mount Lemmon || Mount Lemmon Survey || V || align=right data-sort-value="0.95" | 950 m || 
|-id=076 bgcolor=#fefefe
| 316076 ||  || — || May 14, 2009 || Kitt Peak || Spacewatch || — || align=right | 1.1 km || 
|-id=077 bgcolor=#E9E9E9
| 316077 ||  || — || May 15, 2009 || La Sagra || OAM Obs. || — || align=right | 2.1 km || 
|-id=078 bgcolor=#E9E9E9
| 316078 ||  || — || May 2, 2009 || Cerro Burek || Alianza S4 Obs. || — || align=right | 1.0 km || 
|-id=079 bgcolor=#fefefe
| 316079 ||  || — || May 14, 2009 || Kitt Peak || Spacewatch || NYS || align=right data-sort-value="0.78" | 780 m || 
|-id=080 bgcolor=#fefefe
| 316080 Boni || 2009 KD ||  || May 16, 2009 || Vicques || M. Ory || V || align=right data-sort-value="0.87" | 870 m || 
|-id=081 bgcolor=#fefefe
| 316081 || 2009 KY || — || May 16, 2009 || Dauban || F. Kugel || FLO || align=right data-sort-value="0.66" | 660 m || 
|-id=082 bgcolor=#E9E9E9
| 316082 ||  || — || May 20, 2009 || Mayhill || A. Lowe || — || align=right | 2.5 km || 
|-id=083 bgcolor=#fefefe
| 316083 ||  || — || May 24, 2009 || Catalina || CSS || NYS || align=right data-sort-value="0.84" | 840 m || 
|-id=084 bgcolor=#E9E9E9
| 316084 Mykolapokropyvny ||  ||  || May 26, 2009 || Andrushivka || Andrushivka Obs. || JUN || align=right | 1.3 km || 
|-id=085 bgcolor=#C2FFFF
| 316085 ||  || — || May 25, 2009 || Kitt Peak || Spacewatch || L5 || align=right | 12 km || 
|-id=086 bgcolor=#E9E9E9
| 316086 ||  || — || May 25, 2009 || Kitt Peak || Spacewatch || — || align=right | 1.3 km || 
|-id=087 bgcolor=#fefefe
| 316087 ||  || — || May 25, 2009 || Kitt Peak || Spacewatch || MAS || align=right data-sort-value="0.79" | 790 m || 
|-id=088 bgcolor=#fefefe
| 316088 ||  || — || May 25, 2009 || Kitt Peak || Spacewatch || V || align=right data-sort-value="0.71" | 710 m || 
|-id=089 bgcolor=#fefefe
| 316089 ||  || — || May 26, 2009 || Catalina || CSS || — || align=right data-sort-value="0.98" | 980 m || 
|-id=090 bgcolor=#E9E9E9
| 316090 ||  || — || May 31, 2009 || Catalina || CSS || — || align=right | 1.3 km || 
|-id=091 bgcolor=#fefefe
| 316091 ||  || — || May 27, 2009 || Mount Lemmon || Mount Lemmon Survey || MAS || align=right data-sort-value="0.88" | 880 m || 
|-id=092 bgcolor=#fefefe
| 316092 ||  || — || May 20, 2009 || Sierra Stars || R. Matson || NYS || align=right data-sort-value="0.56" | 560 m || 
|-id=093 bgcolor=#fefefe
| 316093 ||  || — || June 12, 2009 || Catalina || CSS || V || align=right data-sort-value="0.72" | 720 m || 
|-id=094 bgcolor=#E9E9E9
| 316094 ||  || — || June 15, 2009 || Mount Lemmon || Mount Lemmon Survey || — || align=right | 2.8 km || 
|-id=095 bgcolor=#E9E9E9
| 316095 ||  || — || January 16, 2008 || Kitt Peak || Spacewatch || — || align=right | 1.4 km || 
|-id=096 bgcolor=#d6d6d6
| 316096 ||  || — || June 14, 2009 || Kitt Peak || Spacewatch || LIX || align=right | 4.3 km || 
|-id=097 bgcolor=#d6d6d6
| 316097 || 2009 OW || — || July 18, 2009 || Tiki || N. Teamo || HYG || align=right | 3.8 km || 
|-id=098 bgcolor=#d6d6d6
| 316098 ||  || — || July 19, 2009 || Vallemare di Borbona || V. S. Casulli || — || align=right | 3.9 km || 
|-id=099 bgcolor=#d6d6d6
| 316099 ||  || — || July 16, 2009 || La Sagra || OAM Obs. || — || align=right | 4.5 km || 
|-id=100 bgcolor=#d6d6d6
| 316100 ||  || — || July 25, 2009 || La Sagra || OAM Obs. || ALA || align=right | 5.4 km || 
|}

316101–316200 

|-bgcolor=#d6d6d6
| 316101 ||  || — || July 27, 2009 || Kitt Peak || Spacewatch || — || align=right | 2.6 km || 
|-id=102 bgcolor=#d6d6d6
| 316102 ||  || — || July 14, 2009 || Kitt Peak || Spacewatch || — || align=right | 4.2 km || 
|-id=103 bgcolor=#d6d6d6
| 316103 ||  || — || July 28, 2009 || Kitt Peak || Spacewatch || HYG || align=right | 3.2 km || 
|-id=104 bgcolor=#E9E9E9
| 316104 ||  || — || June 23, 2009 || Mount Lemmon || Mount Lemmon Survey || GEF || align=right | 1.7 km || 
|-id=105 bgcolor=#d6d6d6
| 316105 ||  || — || July 31, 2009 || Catalina || CSS || — || align=right | 5.1 km || 
|-id=106 bgcolor=#fefefe
| 316106 || 2009 PM || — || August 12, 2009 || Sandlot || G. Hug || — || align=right data-sort-value="0.86" | 860 m || 
|-id=107 bgcolor=#d6d6d6
| 316107 ||  || — || December 10, 2005 || Kitt Peak || Spacewatch || EOS || align=right | 2.3 km || 
|-id=108 bgcolor=#E9E9E9
| 316108 ||  || — || August 14, 2009 || La Sagra || OAM Obs. || DOR || align=right | 3.1 km || 
|-id=109 bgcolor=#d6d6d6
| 316109 ||  || — || August 15, 2009 || La Sagra || OAM Obs. || — || align=right | 3.6 km || 
|-id=110 bgcolor=#d6d6d6
| 316110 ||  || — || August 15, 2009 || Kitt Peak || Spacewatch || THM || align=right | 3.0 km || 
|-id=111 bgcolor=#d6d6d6
| 316111 ||  || — || August 15, 2009 || Socorro || LINEAR || — || align=right | 5.7 km || 
|-id=112 bgcolor=#E9E9E9
| 316112 ||  || — || August 15, 2009 || Catalina || CSS || — || align=right | 2.0 km || 
|-id=113 bgcolor=#d6d6d6
| 316113 ||  || — || August 15, 2009 || Catalina || CSS || — || align=right | 3.4 km || 
|-id=114 bgcolor=#d6d6d6
| 316114 ||  || — || August 18, 2009 || Calvin-Rehoboth || L. A. Molnar || TIR || align=right | 4.5 km || 
|-id=115 bgcolor=#d6d6d6
| 316115 ||  || — || August 16, 2009 || Kitt Peak || Spacewatch || — || align=right | 3.0 km || 
|-id=116 bgcolor=#E9E9E9
| 316116 ||  || — || August 16, 2009 || Kitt Peak || Spacewatch || — || align=right | 3.6 km || 
|-id=117 bgcolor=#d6d6d6
| 316117 ||  || — || August 20, 2009 || La Sagra || OAM Obs. || BRA || align=right | 1.9 km || 
|-id=118 bgcolor=#d6d6d6
| 316118 ||  || — || August 20, 2009 || La Sagra || OAM Obs. || — || align=right | 4.0 km || 
|-id=119 bgcolor=#C2FFFF
| 316119 ||  || — || August 20, 2009 || Magasa || Cima Rest Obs. || L4 || align=right | 11 km || 
|-id=120 bgcolor=#E9E9E9
| 316120 ||  || — || August 21, 2009 || Sandlot || G. Hug || — || align=right | 2.3 km || 
|-id=121 bgcolor=#d6d6d6
| 316121 ||  || — || July 28, 2009 || Kitt Peak || Spacewatch || VER || align=right | 3.5 km || 
|-id=122 bgcolor=#d6d6d6
| 316122 ||  || — || August 21, 2009 || La Sagra || OAM Obs. || THM || align=right | 2.9 km || 
|-id=123 bgcolor=#d6d6d6
| 316123 ||  || — || August 25, 2009 || Sandlot || G. Hug || CRO || align=right | 4.1 km || 
|-id=124 bgcolor=#d6d6d6
| 316124 ||  || — || August 28, 2009 || La Sagra || OAM Obs. || — || align=right | 4.5 km || 
|-id=125 bgcolor=#d6d6d6
| 316125 ||  || — || August 19, 2009 || Kitt Peak || Spacewatch || — || align=right | 3.6 km || 
|-id=126 bgcolor=#E9E9E9
| 316126 ||  || — || September 14, 2009 || Catalina || CSS || GAL || align=right | 2.1 km || 
|-id=127 bgcolor=#C2FFFF
| 316127 ||  || — || September 14, 2009 || Kitt Peak || Spacewatch || L4 || align=right | 7.4 km || 
|-id=128 bgcolor=#C2FFFF
| 316128 ||  || — || September 15, 2009 || Kitt Peak || Spacewatch || L4 || align=right | 8.8 km || 
|-id=129 bgcolor=#C2FFFF
| 316129 ||  || — || September 15, 2009 || Kitt Peak || Spacewatch || L4 || align=right | 8.1 km || 
|-id=130 bgcolor=#C2FFFF
| 316130 ||  || — || September 15, 2009 || Kitt Peak || Spacewatch || L4ERY || align=right | 10 km || 
|-id=131 bgcolor=#d6d6d6
| 316131 ||  || — || September 19, 2009 || Bisei SG Center || BATTeRS || — || align=right | 4.1 km || 
|-id=132 bgcolor=#C2FFFF
| 316132 ||  || — || September 22, 2009 || Taunus || S. Karge, R. Kling || L4 || align=right | 8.3 km || 
|-id=133 bgcolor=#C2FFFF
| 316133 ||  || — || October 25, 1997 || Caussols || ODAS || L4 || align=right | 9.8 km || 
|-id=134 bgcolor=#C2FFFF
| 316134 ||  || — || September 16, 2009 || Kitt Peak || Spacewatch || L4 || align=right | 8.9 km || 
|-id=135 bgcolor=#C2FFFF
| 316135 ||  || — || September 17, 2009 || Kitt Peak || Spacewatch || L4 || align=right | 7.7 km || 
|-id=136 bgcolor=#d6d6d6
| 316136 ||  || — || December 10, 2005 || Kitt Peak || Spacewatch || — || align=right | 3.5 km || 
|-id=137 bgcolor=#C2FFFF
| 316137 ||  || — || September 18, 2009 || Kitt Peak || Spacewatch || L4 || align=right | 8.2 km || 
|-id=138 bgcolor=#d6d6d6
| 316138 Giorgione ||  ||  || September 26, 2009 || Saint-Sulpice || B. Christophe || — || align=right | 3.7 km || 
|-id=139 bgcolor=#d6d6d6
| 316139 ||  || — || April 15, 2007 || Mount Lemmon || Mount Lemmon Survey || — || align=right | 4.7 km || 
|-id=140 bgcolor=#d6d6d6
| 316140 ||  || — || September 17, 2009 || Catalina || CSS || — || align=right | 4.4 km || 
|-id=141 bgcolor=#C2FFFF
| 316141 ||  || — || September 16, 2009 || Kitt Peak || Spacewatch || L4 || align=right | 12 km || 
|-id=142 bgcolor=#d6d6d6
| 316142 ||  || — || September 25, 2009 || Kitt Peak || Spacewatch || HYG || align=right | 3.3 km || 
|-id=143 bgcolor=#d6d6d6
| 316143 ||  || — || September 25, 2009 || Kitt Peak || Spacewatch || — || align=right | 4.8 km || 
|-id=144 bgcolor=#C2FFFF
| 316144 ||  || — || September 16, 2009 || Kitt Peak || Spacewatch || L4 || align=right | 10 km || 
|-id=145 bgcolor=#d6d6d6
| 316145 ||  || — || March 25, 2007 || Mount Lemmon || Mount Lemmon Survey || 3:2 || align=right | 6.3 km || 
|-id=146 bgcolor=#C2FFFF
| 316146 ||  || — || September 16, 2009 || Kitt Peak || Spacewatch || L4 || align=right | 8.6 km || 
|-id=147 bgcolor=#C2FFFF
| 316147 ||  || — || September 16, 2009 || Mount Lemmon || Mount Lemmon Survey || L4 || align=right | 11 km || 
|-id=148 bgcolor=#C2FFFF
| 316148 ||  || — || September 22, 2009 || Mount Lemmon || Mount Lemmon Survey || L4 || align=right | 8.5 km || 
|-id=149 bgcolor=#C2FFFF
| 316149 ||  || — || September 25, 2009 || Kitt Peak || Spacewatch || L4 || align=right | 10 km || 
|-id=150 bgcolor=#C2FFFF
| 316150 ||  || — || September 29, 2009 || Mount Lemmon || Mount Lemmon Survey || L4 || align=right | 9.2 km || 
|-id=151 bgcolor=#d6d6d6
| 316151 ||  || — || September 16, 2009 || Kitt Peak || Spacewatch || — || align=right | 3.4 km || 
|-id=152 bgcolor=#C2FFFF
| 316152 ||  || — || September 30, 2009 || Mount Lemmon || Mount Lemmon Survey || L4 || align=right | 11 km || 
|-id=153 bgcolor=#C2FFFF
| 316153 ||  || — || October 14, 2009 || Catalina || CSS || L4ARK || align=right | 10 km || 
|-id=154 bgcolor=#d6d6d6
| 316154 ||  || — || October 14, 2009 || La Sagra || OAM Obs. || EOS || align=right | 2.6 km || 
|-id=155 bgcolor=#C2FFFF
| 316155 ||  || — || October 15, 2009 || La Sagra || OAM Obs. || L4 || align=right | 11 km || 
|-id=156 bgcolor=#C2FFFF
| 316156 ||  || — || October 18, 2009 || Bisei SG Center || BATTeRS || L4 || align=right | 9.6 km || 
|-id=157 bgcolor=#C2FFFF
| 316157 ||  || — || October 18, 2009 || Kitt Peak || Spacewatch || L4ERY || align=right | 8.3 km || 
|-id=158 bgcolor=#C2FFFF
| 316158 ||  || — || October 21, 2009 || Catalina || CSS || L4 || align=right | 17 km || 
|-id=159 bgcolor=#C2FFFF
| 316159 ||  || — || October 18, 2009 || Mount Lemmon || Mount Lemmon Survey || L4 || align=right | 8.2 km || 
|-id=160 bgcolor=#C2FFFF
| 316160 ||  || — || August 24, 2008 || Kitt Peak || Spacewatch || L4 || align=right | 8.4 km || 
|-id=161 bgcolor=#C2FFFF
| 316161 ||  || — || April 25, 2003 || Kitt Peak || Spacewatch || L4 || align=right | 11 km || 
|-id=162 bgcolor=#C2FFFF
| 316162 ||  || — || October 23, 2009 || Kitt Peak || Spacewatch || L4 || align=right | 9.9 km || 
|-id=163 bgcolor=#C2FFFF
| 316163 ||  || — || November 9, 2009 || Kitt Peak || Spacewatch || L4 || align=right | 7.8 km || 
|-id=164 bgcolor=#C2FFFF
| 316164 ||  || — || November 10, 2009 || Kitt Peak || Spacewatch || L4 || align=right | 7.2 km || 
|-id=165 bgcolor=#C2FFFF
| 316165 ||  || — || March 31, 2003 || Kitt Peak || Spacewatch || L4ERY || align=right | 14 km || 
|-id=166 bgcolor=#C2FFFF
| 316166 ||  || — || November 16, 2009 || Kitt Peak || Spacewatch || L4 || align=right | 7.5 km || 
|-id=167 bgcolor=#d6d6d6
| 316167 ||  || — || November 16, 2009 || Mount Lemmon || Mount Lemmon Survey || — || align=right | 4.5 km || 
|-id=168 bgcolor=#C2FFFF
| 316168 ||  || — || November 16, 2009 || Mount Lemmon || Mount Lemmon Survey || L4 || align=right | 8.1 km || 
|-id=169 bgcolor=#C2FFFF
| 316169 ||  || — || September 22, 2008 || Kitt Peak || Spacewatch || L4 || align=right | 7.9 km || 
|-id=170 bgcolor=#C2FFFF
| 316170 ||  || — || November 19, 2009 || Mount Lemmon || Mount Lemmon Survey || L4 || align=right | 15 km || 
|-id=171 bgcolor=#d6d6d6
| 316171 ||  || — || August 5, 2008 || Siding Spring || SSS || — || align=right | 4.4 km || 
|-id=172 bgcolor=#d6d6d6
| 316172 ||  || — || November 20, 2009 || La Silla || La Silla Obs. || — || align=right | 4.5 km || 
|-id=173 bgcolor=#C2FFFF
| 316173 ||  || — || November 17, 2009 || Catalina || CSS || L4 || align=right | 11 km || 
|-id=174 bgcolor=#C2FFFF
| 316174 ||  || — || November 23, 2009 || Mount Lemmon || Mount Lemmon Survey || L4ERY || align=right | 11 km || 
|-id=175 bgcolor=#C2FFFF
| 316175 ||  || — || February 13, 2002 || Kitt Peak || Spacewatch || L4 || align=right | 14 km || 
|-id=176 bgcolor=#C2FFFF
| 316176 ||  || — || October 27, 2009 || Mount Lemmon || Mount Lemmon Survey || L4 || align=right | 10 km || 
|-id=177 bgcolor=#C2FFFF
| 316177 ||  || — || May 14, 2004 || Kitt Peak || Spacewatch || L4 || align=right | 15 km || 
|-id=178 bgcolor=#E9E9E9
| 316178 ||  || — || February 15, 2010 || Kitt Peak || Spacewatch || — || align=right | 1.6 km || 
|-id=179 bgcolor=#C2E0FF
| 316179 ||  || — || March 7, 2010 || La Silla || D. L. Rabinowitz, S. Tourtellotte || centaur || align=right | 163 km || 
|-id=180 bgcolor=#E9E9E9
| 316180 ||  || — || April 10, 2010 || WISE || WISE || — || align=right | 2.3 km || 
|-id=181 bgcolor=#fefefe
| 316181 ||  || — || April 10, 2010 || Kitt Peak || Spacewatch || H || align=right data-sort-value="0.89" | 890 m || 
|-id=182 bgcolor=#fefefe
| 316182 ||  || — || October 23, 2003 || Apache Point || SDSS || ERI || align=right | 1.6 km || 
|-id=183 bgcolor=#fefefe
| 316183 ||  || — || April 21, 2010 || WISE || WISE || — || align=right | 1.3 km || 
|-id=184 bgcolor=#E9E9E9
| 316184 ||  || — || May 13, 2010 || WISE || WISE || GEF || align=right | 1.0 km || 
|-id=185 bgcolor=#E9E9E9
| 316185 ||  || — || May 13, 2010 || WISE || WISE || — || align=right | 1.8 km || 
|-id=186 bgcolor=#E9E9E9
| 316186 Kathrynjoyce ||  ||  || May 19, 2010 || WISE || WISE || — || align=right | 2.9 km || 
|-id=187 bgcolor=#d6d6d6
| 316187 ||  || — || May 21, 2010 || WISE || WISE || — || align=right | 4.5 km || 
|-id=188 bgcolor=#E9E9E9
| 316188 ||  || — || March 17, 2009 || Kitt Peak || Spacewatch || — || align=right | 1.9 km || 
|-id=189 bgcolor=#d6d6d6
| 316189 ||  || — || December 27, 2006 || Mount Lemmon || Mount Lemmon Survey || VER || align=right | 3.1 km || 
|-id=190 bgcolor=#E9E9E9
| 316190 ||  || — || March 3, 2000 || Apache Point || SDSS || — || align=right | 2.1 km || 
|-id=191 bgcolor=#d6d6d6
| 316191 ||  || — || May 1, 2009 || Mount Lemmon || Mount Lemmon Survey || NAE || align=right | 3.8 km || 
|-id=192 bgcolor=#fefefe
| 316192 ||  || — || June 8, 2010 || WISE || WISE || — || align=right | 1.8 km || 
|-id=193 bgcolor=#fefefe
| 316193 ||  || — || June 10, 2010 || WISE || WISE || — || align=right | 1.9 km || 
|-id=194 bgcolor=#fefefe
| 316194 ||  || — || June 11, 2010 || WISE || WISE || NYS || align=right | 1.4 km || 
|-id=195 bgcolor=#E9E9E9
| 316195 ||  || — || June 13, 2010 || WISE || WISE || — || align=right | 2.8 km || 
|-id=196 bgcolor=#d6d6d6
| 316196 ||  || — || June 14, 2010 || WISE || WISE || — || align=right | 3.7 km || 
|-id=197 bgcolor=#E9E9E9
| 316197 ||  || — || September 17, 2006 || Catalina || CSS || GER || align=right | 1.6 km || 
|-id=198 bgcolor=#d6d6d6
| 316198 ||  || — || June 21, 2010 || WISE || WISE || — || align=right | 3.0 km || 
|-id=199 bgcolor=#d6d6d6
| 316199 ||  || — || June 21, 2010 || WISE || WISE || — || align=right | 2.3 km || 
|-id=200 bgcolor=#d6d6d6
| 316200 ||  || — || August 22, 2004 || Kitt Peak || Spacewatch || — || align=right | 4.3 km || 
|}

316201–316300 

|-bgcolor=#d6d6d6
| 316201 Malala ||  ||  || June 23, 2010 || WISE || WISE || TIR || align=right | 4.1 km || 
|-id=202 bgcolor=#E9E9E9
| 316202 Johnfowler ||  ||  || June 16, 2010 || WISE || WISE || HOF || align=right | 2.5 km || 
|-id=203 bgcolor=#d6d6d6
| 316203 ||  || — || February 27, 2008 || Kitt Peak || Spacewatch || HYG || align=right | 4.0 km || 
|-id=204 bgcolor=#d6d6d6
| 316204 ||  || — || June 24, 2010 || WISE || WISE || — || align=right | 2.9 km || 
|-id=205 bgcolor=#E9E9E9
| 316205 ||  || — || October 23, 2001 || Palomar || NEAT || — || align=right | 3.8 km || 
|-id=206 bgcolor=#d6d6d6
| 316206 ||  || — || June 26, 2010 || WISE || WISE || HIL3:2 || align=right | 5.2 km || 
|-id=207 bgcolor=#d6d6d6
| 316207 ||  || — || October 10, 2005 || Catalina || CSS || — || align=right | 3.7 km || 
|-id=208 bgcolor=#d6d6d6
| 316208 ||  || — || April 7, 2008 || Kitt Peak || Spacewatch || HYG || align=right | 2.9 km || 
|-id=209 bgcolor=#d6d6d6
| 316209 ||  || — || June 28, 2010 || WISE || WISE || HYG || align=right | 2.6 km || 
|-id=210 bgcolor=#E9E9E9
| 316210 ||  || — || January 11, 2008 || Mount Lemmon || Mount Lemmon Survey || ADE || align=right | 3.5 km || 
|-id=211 bgcolor=#fefefe
| 316211 ||  || — || February 12, 2004 || Palomar || NEAT || — || align=right | 2.1 km || 
|-id=212 bgcolor=#E9E9E9
| 316212 ||  || — || July 28, 2005 || Palomar || NEAT || HOF || align=right | 2.5 km || 
|-id=213 bgcolor=#fefefe
| 316213 ||  || — || July 6, 2010 || Mount Lemmon || Mount Lemmon Survey || — || align=right data-sort-value="0.95" | 950 m || 
|-id=214 bgcolor=#E9E9E9
| 316214 ||  || — || September 19, 2006 || Catalina || CSS || — || align=right | 1.7 km || 
|-id=215 bgcolor=#d6d6d6
| 316215 ||  || — || July 5, 2010 || WISE || WISE || — || align=right | 4.4 km || 
|-id=216 bgcolor=#fefefe
| 316216 ||  || — || March 9, 2005 || Kitt Peak || Spacewatch || CLA || align=right | 1.6 km || 
|-id=217 bgcolor=#d6d6d6
| 316217 ||  || — || September 23, 2005 || Kitt Peak || Spacewatch || — || align=right | 3.0 km || 
|-id=218 bgcolor=#d6d6d6
| 316218 ||  || — || March 9, 2007 || Kitt Peak || Spacewatch || — || align=right | 4.0 km || 
|-id=219 bgcolor=#E9E9E9
| 316219 ||  || — || July 8, 2010 || WISE || WISE || — || align=right | 2.6 km || 
|-id=220 bgcolor=#d6d6d6
| 316220 ||  || — || March 11, 2008 || Kitt Peak || Spacewatch || — || align=right | 4.0 km || 
|-id=221 bgcolor=#E9E9E9
| 316221 ||  || — || July 4, 2005 || Palomar || NEAT || HNA || align=right | 2.9 km || 
|-id=222 bgcolor=#d6d6d6
| 316222 ||  || — || July 9, 2010 || WISE || WISE || MEL || align=right | 4.2 km || 
|-id=223 bgcolor=#d6d6d6
| 316223 ||  || — || August 8, 2004 || Anderson Mesa || LONEOS || — || align=right | 4.4 km || 
|-id=224 bgcolor=#E9E9E9
| 316224 ||  || — || September 25, 2005 || Kitt Peak || Spacewatch || — || align=right | 2.7 km || 
|-id=225 bgcolor=#E9E9E9
| 316225 ||  || — || October 3, 2006 || Mount Lemmon || Mount Lemmon Survey || — || align=right | 2.6 km || 
|-id=226 bgcolor=#d6d6d6
| 316226 ||  || — || October 8, 1999 || Socorro || LINEAR || TIR || align=right | 2.0 km || 
|-id=227 bgcolor=#E9E9E9
| 316227 ||  || — || December 30, 2007 || Kitt Peak || Spacewatch || — || align=right | 3.8 km || 
|-id=228 bgcolor=#d6d6d6
| 316228 ||  || — || July 12, 2010 || WISE || WISE || — || align=right | 3.6 km || 
|-id=229 bgcolor=#d6d6d6
| 316229 ||  || — || December 21, 2006 || Mount Lemmon || Mount Lemmon Survey || EOS || align=right | 2.7 km || 
|-id=230 bgcolor=#d6d6d6
| 316230 ||  || — || July 13, 2010 || WISE || WISE || — || align=right | 4.4 km || 
|-id=231 bgcolor=#E9E9E9
| 316231 ||  || — || July 14, 2010 || WISE || WISE || AST || align=right | 1.7 km || 
|-id=232 bgcolor=#E9E9E9
| 316232 ||  || — || July 16, 2010 || WISE || WISE || NEM || align=right | 2.9 km || 
|-id=233 bgcolor=#d6d6d6
| 316233 ||  || — || October 22, 2005 || Kitt Peak || Spacewatch || — || align=right | 3.9 km || 
|-id=234 bgcolor=#d6d6d6
| 316234 ||  || — || September 13, 2004 || Kitt Peak || Spacewatch || — || align=right | 2.6 km || 
|-id=235 bgcolor=#E9E9E9
| 316235 ||  || — || December 15, 2006 || Kitt Peak || Spacewatch || HOF || align=right | 4.1 km || 
|-id=236 bgcolor=#E9E9E9
| 316236 ||  || — || August 1, 2005 || Siding Spring || SSS || — || align=right | 2.3 km || 
|-id=237 bgcolor=#d6d6d6
| 316237 ||  || — || August 7, 2004 || Palomar || NEAT || EOS || align=right | 3.7 km || 
|-id=238 bgcolor=#d6d6d6
| 316238 ||  || — || March 26, 2003 || Kitt Peak || Spacewatch || — || align=right | 4.1 km || 
|-id=239 bgcolor=#d6d6d6
| 316239 ||  || — || March 14, 2007 || Kitt Peak || Spacewatch || — || align=right | 3.3 km || 
|-id=240 bgcolor=#d6d6d6
| 316240 ||  || — || July 19, 2010 || WISE || WISE || — || align=right | 5.4 km || 
|-id=241 bgcolor=#E9E9E9
| 316241 ||  || — || July 19, 2010 || WISE || WISE || — || align=right | 1.7 km || 
|-id=242 bgcolor=#d6d6d6
| 316242 ||  || — || February 6, 2007 || Kitt Peak || Spacewatch || — || align=right | 2.7 km || 
|-id=243 bgcolor=#d6d6d6
| 316243 ||  || — || December 1, 2005 || Kitt Peak || Spacewatch || — || align=right | 4.0 km || 
|-id=244 bgcolor=#d6d6d6
| 316244 ||  || — || April 14, 2004 || Kitt Peak || Spacewatch || — || align=right | 4.2 km || 
|-id=245 bgcolor=#d6d6d6
| 316245 ||  || — || December 27, 2000 || Kitt Peak || Spacewatch || — || align=right | 5.0 km || 
|-id=246 bgcolor=#d6d6d6
| 316246 ||  || — || September 15, 2004 || Kitt Peak || Spacewatch || URS || align=right | 6.0 km || 
|-id=247 bgcolor=#d6d6d6
| 316247 ||  || — || February 11, 2002 || Socorro || LINEAR || — || align=right | 2.7 km || 
|-id=248 bgcolor=#E9E9E9
| 316248 ||  || — || January 5, 2003 || Kitt Peak || Spacewatch || — || align=right | 3.2 km || 
|-id=249 bgcolor=#d6d6d6
| 316249 ||  || — || September 8, 1999 || Socorro || LINEAR || slow || align=right | 1.8 km || 
|-id=250 bgcolor=#d6d6d6
| 316250 ||  || — || February 19, 2001 || Kitt Peak || Spacewatch || — || align=right | 5.8 km || 
|-id=251 bgcolor=#d6d6d6
| 316251 ||  || — || March 31, 2008 || Mount Lemmon || Mount Lemmon Survey || — || align=right | 4.6 km || 
|-id=252 bgcolor=#E9E9E9
| 316252 ||  || — || November 22, 2006 || Kitt Peak || Spacewatch || — || align=right | 3.0 km || 
|-id=253 bgcolor=#d6d6d6
| 316253 ||  || — || September 26, 1992 || Kitt Peak || Spacewatch || — || align=right | 5.7 km || 
|-id=254 bgcolor=#E9E9E9
| 316254 ||  || — || November 20, 2006 || Mount Lemmon || Mount Lemmon Survey || — || align=right | 2.8 km || 
|-id=255 bgcolor=#E9E9E9
| 316255 ||  || — || July 27, 2010 || WISE || WISE || — || align=right | 2.2 km || 
|-id=256 bgcolor=#d6d6d6
| 316256 ||  || — || January 19, 1996 || Kitt Peak || Spacewatch || EOS || align=right | 2.8 km || 
|-id=257 bgcolor=#E9E9E9
| 316257 ||  || — || March 12, 2003 || Kitt Peak || Spacewatch || PAD || align=right | 3.1 km || 
|-id=258 bgcolor=#E9E9E9
| 316258 ||  || — || July 20, 2010 || Shenton Park || P. Luckas || — || align=right | 1.6 km || 
|-id=259 bgcolor=#fefefe
| 316259 ||  || — || July 21, 2010 || Bisei SG Center || BATTeRS || FLO || align=right data-sort-value="0.64" | 640 m || 
|-id=260 bgcolor=#d6d6d6
| 316260 ||  || — || October 13, 1999 || Apache Point || SDSS || EMA || align=right | 3.8 km || 
|-id=261 bgcolor=#d6d6d6
| 316261 ||  || — || December 27, 2006 || Mount Lemmon || Mount Lemmon Survey || — || align=right | 2.9 km || 
|-id=262 bgcolor=#E9E9E9
| 316262 ||  || — || November 27, 2006 || Kitt Peak || Spacewatch || — || align=right | 4.2 km || 
|-id=263 bgcolor=#E9E9E9
| 316263 ||  || — || July 31, 2010 || WISE || WISE || — || align=right | 1.4 km || 
|-id=264 bgcolor=#fefefe
| 316264 ||  || — || August 3, 2010 || Socorro || LINEAR || — || align=right | 1.1 km || 
|-id=265 bgcolor=#fefefe
| 316265 ||  || — || August 4, 2010 || Socorro || LINEAR || — || align=right | 1.4 km || 
|-id=266 bgcolor=#d6d6d6
| 316266 ||  || — || July 26, 1998 || Caussols || ODAS || — || align=right | 3.9 km || 
|-id=267 bgcolor=#C2FFFF
| 316267 ||  || — || August 7, 2010 || WISE || WISE || L4ERY || align=right | 12 km || 
|-id=268 bgcolor=#fefefe
| 316268 ||  || — || August 7, 2010 || La Sagra || OAM Obs. || V || align=right data-sort-value="0.95" | 950 m || 
|-id=269 bgcolor=#d6d6d6
| 316269 ||  || — || October 4, 1999 || Kitt Peak || Spacewatch || — || align=right | 2.6 km || 
|-id=270 bgcolor=#E9E9E9
| 316270 ||  || — || June 17, 2005 || Mount Lemmon || Mount Lemmon Survey || NEM || align=right | 2.0 km || 
|-id=271 bgcolor=#d6d6d6
| 316271 ||  || — || February 21, 2007 || Mount Lemmon || Mount Lemmon Survey || — || align=right | 4.1 km || 
|-id=272 bgcolor=#d6d6d6
| 316272 ||  || — || April 3, 2008 || Kitt Peak || Spacewatch || — || align=right | 4.6 km || 
|-id=273 bgcolor=#d6d6d6
| 316273 ||  || — || January 3, 2001 || Anderson Mesa || LONEOS || — || align=right | 4.6 km || 
|-id=274 bgcolor=#d6d6d6
| 316274 ||  || — || November 10, 1999 || Kitt Peak || Spacewatch || — || align=right | 5.3 km || 
|-id=275 bgcolor=#d6d6d6
| 316275 ||  || — || April 6, 2008 || Mount Lemmon || Mount Lemmon Survey || — || align=right | 3.3 km || 
|-id=276 bgcolor=#d6d6d6
| 316276 ||  || — || September 9, 2004 || Socorro || LINEAR || — || align=right | 4.9 km || 
|-id=277 bgcolor=#E9E9E9
| 316277 ||  || — || February 13, 2004 || Kitt Peak || Spacewatch || — || align=right | 3.5 km || 
|-id=278 bgcolor=#E9E9E9
| 316278 ||  || — || February 12, 2008 || Mount Lemmon || Mount Lemmon Survey || — || align=right | 2.6 km || 
|-id=279 bgcolor=#E9E9E9
| 316279 ||  || — || August 9, 2010 || Purple Mountain || PMO NEO || — || align=right | 2.0 km || 
|-id=280 bgcolor=#fefefe
| 316280 ||  || — || August 10, 2010 || Kitt Peak || Spacewatch || MAS || align=right data-sort-value="0.95" | 950 m || 
|-id=281 bgcolor=#fefefe
| 316281 ||  || — || August 10, 2010 || Kitt Peak || Spacewatch || V || align=right data-sort-value="0.76" | 760 m || 
|-id=282 bgcolor=#E9E9E9
| 316282 ||  || — || August 10, 2010 || Kitt Peak || Spacewatch || — || align=right | 1.2 km || 
|-id=283 bgcolor=#E9E9E9
| 316283 ||  || — || July 22, 2001 || Palomar || NEAT || ADE || align=right | 3.2 km || 
|-id=284 bgcolor=#fefefe
| 316284 ||  || — || August 11, 2010 || La Sagra || OAM Obs. || V || align=right data-sort-value="0.73" | 730 m || 
|-id=285 bgcolor=#fefefe
| 316285 ||  || — || August 13, 2010 || Kitt Peak || Spacewatch || — || align=right data-sort-value="0.81" | 810 m || 
|-id=286 bgcolor=#fefefe
| 316286 ||  || — || March 31, 2009 || Mount Lemmon || Mount Lemmon Survey || — || align=right | 1.4 km || 
|-id=287 bgcolor=#fefefe
| 316287 ||  || — || September 1, 2010 || Socorro || LINEAR || NYS || align=right data-sort-value="0.77" | 770 m || 
|-id=288 bgcolor=#fefefe
| 316288 ||  || — || September 1, 2010 || Socorro || LINEAR || MAS || align=right | 1.1 km || 
|-id=289 bgcolor=#fefefe
| 316289 ||  || — || March 8, 2005 || Mount Lemmon || Mount Lemmon Survey || — || align=right | 1.00 km || 
|-id=290 bgcolor=#fefefe
| 316290 ||  || — || September 1, 2010 || Socorro || LINEAR || NYS || align=right | 1.00 km || 
|-id=291 bgcolor=#E9E9E9
| 316291 ||  || — || September 2, 2010 || Mount Lemmon || Mount Lemmon Survey || — || align=right | 2.2 km || 
|-id=292 bgcolor=#d6d6d6
| 316292 ||  || — || September 3, 2010 || Mount Lemmon || Mount Lemmon Survey || 615 || align=right | 1.7 km || 
|-id=293 bgcolor=#d6d6d6
| 316293 ||  || — || September 2, 2010 || Mount Lemmon || Mount Lemmon Survey || CHA || align=right | 2.7 km || 
|-id=294 bgcolor=#E9E9E9
| 316294 ||  || — || September 5, 2010 || La Sagra || OAM Obs. || — || align=right | 2.5 km || 
|-id=295 bgcolor=#d6d6d6
| 316295 ||  || — || September 4, 2010 || La Sagra || OAM Obs. || TIR || align=right | 3.5 km || 
|-id=296 bgcolor=#fefefe
| 316296 ||  || — || September 25, 2000 || Anderson Mesa || LONEOS || — || align=right | 1.1 km || 
|-id=297 bgcolor=#d6d6d6
| 316297 ||  || — || August 30, 2005 || Kitt Peak || Spacewatch || — || align=right | 2.3 km || 
|-id=298 bgcolor=#d6d6d6
| 316298 ||  || — || September 9, 2004 || Apache Point || G. A. Esquerdo || THM || align=right | 2.2 km || 
|-id=299 bgcolor=#E9E9E9
| 316299 ||  || — || October 2, 2006 || Kitt Peak || Spacewatch || — || align=right | 1.5 km || 
|-id=300 bgcolor=#E9E9E9
| 316300 ||  || — || October 19, 2006 || Mount Lemmon || Mount Lemmon Survey || — || align=right data-sort-value="0.97" | 970 m || 
|}

316301–316400 

|-bgcolor=#d6d6d6
| 316301 ||  || — || August 28, 2005 || Kitt Peak || Spacewatch || CHA || align=right | 1.7 km || 
|-id=302 bgcolor=#d6d6d6
| 316302 ||  || — || October 3, 1999 || Kitt Peak || Spacewatch || EOS || align=right | 2.1 km || 
|-id=303 bgcolor=#fefefe
| 316303 ||  || — || September 3, 2010 || Mount Lemmon || Mount Lemmon Survey || — || align=right data-sort-value="0.82" | 820 m || 
|-id=304 bgcolor=#fefefe
| 316304 ||  || — || September 9, 2010 || Kitt Peak || Spacewatch || — || align=right | 1.1 km || 
|-id=305 bgcolor=#E9E9E9
| 316305 ||  || — || September 4, 2010 || Socorro || LINEAR || — || align=right | 2.2 km || 
|-id=306 bgcolor=#fefefe
| 316306 ||  || — || March 9, 2005 || Mount Lemmon || Mount Lemmon Survey || — || align=right data-sort-value="0.92" | 920 m || 
|-id=307 bgcolor=#d6d6d6
| 316307 ||  || — || September 5, 2010 || Dauban || F. Kugel || — || align=right | 2.7 km || 
|-id=308 bgcolor=#fefefe
| 316308 ||  || — || December 10, 2004 || Kitt Peak || Spacewatch || FLO || align=right data-sort-value="0.87" | 870 m || 
|-id=309 bgcolor=#fefefe
| 316309 ||  || — || November 18, 2003 || Kitt Peak || Spacewatch || — || align=right | 1.2 km || 
|-id=310 bgcolor=#E9E9E9
| 316310 ||  || — || March 6, 2008 || Mount Lemmon || Mount Lemmon Survey || GEF || align=right | 1.4 km || 
|-id=311 bgcolor=#E9E9E9
| 316311 ||  || — || November 22, 2006 || Kitt Peak || Spacewatch || — || align=right | 2.4 km || 
|-id=312 bgcolor=#E9E9E9
| 316312 ||  || — || April 21, 2004 || Kitt Peak || Spacewatch || GEF || align=right | 1.3 km || 
|-id=313 bgcolor=#E9E9E9
| 316313 ||  || — || February 28, 2000 || Kitt Peak || Spacewatch || MAR || align=right | 1.4 km || 
|-id=314 bgcolor=#E9E9E9
| 316314 ||  || — || October 22, 2006 || Mount Lemmon || Mount Lemmon Survey || — || align=right | 3.2 km || 
|-id=315 bgcolor=#fefefe
| 316315 ||  || — || September 10, 2010 || Kitt Peak || Spacewatch || — || align=right data-sort-value="0.95" | 950 m || 
|-id=316 bgcolor=#E9E9E9
| 316316 ||  || — || February 9, 2008 || Kitt Peak || Spacewatch || — || align=right | 1.4 km || 
|-id=317 bgcolor=#fefefe
| 316317 ||  || — || February 2, 2005 || Kitt Peak || Spacewatch || — || align=right | 1.1 km || 
|-id=318 bgcolor=#E9E9E9
| 316318 ||  || — || September 10, 2010 || Kitt Peak || Spacewatch || — || align=right | 2.0 km || 
|-id=319 bgcolor=#fefefe
| 316319 ||  || — || November 23, 2003 || Kitt Peak || Spacewatch || V || align=right data-sort-value="0.84" | 840 m || 
|-id=320 bgcolor=#fefefe
| 316320 ||  || — || September 28, 2003 || Kitt Peak || Spacewatch || — || align=right data-sort-value="0.86" | 860 m || 
|-id=321 bgcolor=#fefefe
| 316321 ||  || — || October 11, 1999 || Kitt Peak || Spacewatch || CLA || align=right | 1.7 km || 
|-id=322 bgcolor=#fefefe
| 316322 ||  || — || May 24, 2006 || Mount Lemmon || Mount Lemmon Survey || — || align=right | 1.0 km || 
|-id=323 bgcolor=#fefefe
| 316323 ||  || — || April 8, 2002 || Palomar || NEAT || MAS || align=right data-sort-value="0.85" | 850 m || 
|-id=324 bgcolor=#E9E9E9
| 316324 ||  || — || September 13, 2010 || Kachina || J. Hobart || 526 || align=right | 2.9 km || 
|-id=325 bgcolor=#E9E9E9
| 316325 ||  || — || September 18, 2001 || Kitt Peak || Spacewatch || — || align=right | 1.4 km || 
|-id=326 bgcolor=#E9E9E9
| 316326 ||  || — || October 18, 2001 || Palomar || NEAT || AST || align=right | 1.7 km || 
|-id=327 bgcolor=#E9E9E9
| 316327 ||  || — || September 11, 2010 || Kitt Peak || Spacewatch || WIT || align=right | 1.3 km || 
|-id=328 bgcolor=#fefefe
| 316328 ||  || — || September 7, 1999 || Kitt Peak || Spacewatch || V || align=right data-sort-value="0.65" | 650 m || 
|-id=329 bgcolor=#E9E9E9
| 316329 ||  || — || May 13, 2004 || Kitt Peak || Spacewatch || WIT || align=right | 1.0 km || 
|-id=330 bgcolor=#fefefe
| 316330 ||  || — || September 18, 2003 || Anderson Mesa || LONEOS || — || align=right data-sort-value="0.88" | 880 m || 
|-id=331 bgcolor=#E9E9E9
| 316331 ||  || — || October 21, 2001 || Socorro || LINEAR || WIT || align=right | 1.5 km || 
|-id=332 bgcolor=#E9E9E9
| 316332 ||  || — || September 18, 2001 || Kitt Peak || Spacewatch || — || align=right | 2.4 km || 
|-id=333 bgcolor=#E9E9E9
| 316333 ||  || — || September 19, 2001 || Ondřejov || Ondřejov Obs. || — || align=right | 2.4 km || 
|-id=334 bgcolor=#E9E9E9
| 316334 ||  || — || October 11, 2001 || Kitt Peak || Spacewatch || — || align=right | 2.0 km || 
|-id=335 bgcolor=#d6d6d6
| 316335 ||  || — || October 12, 1999 || Kitt Peak || Spacewatch || HYG || align=right | 2.9 km || 
|-id=336 bgcolor=#fefefe
| 316336 ||  || — || February 9, 2005 || Anderson Mesa || LONEOS || — || align=right data-sort-value="0.99" | 990 m || 
|-id=337 bgcolor=#fefefe
| 316337 ||  || — || November 2, 2007 || Mount Lemmon || Mount Lemmon Survey || — || align=right data-sort-value="0.80" | 800 m || 
|-id=338 bgcolor=#d6d6d6
| 316338 ||  || — || April 29, 2003 || Kitt Peak || Spacewatch || — || align=right | 3.2 km || 
|-id=339 bgcolor=#d6d6d6
| 316339 ||  || — || October 27, 2005 || Kitt Peak || Spacewatch || — || align=right | 2.8 km || 
|-id=340 bgcolor=#E9E9E9
| 316340 ||  || — || October 6, 2005 || Kitt Peak || Spacewatch || — || align=right | 3.2 km || 
|-id=341 bgcolor=#E9E9E9
| 316341 ||  || — || September 30, 2006 || Mount Lemmon || Mount Lemmon Survey || — || align=right | 1.7 km || 
|-id=342 bgcolor=#fefefe
| 316342 ||  || — || October 13, 1999 || Apache Point || SDSS || — || align=right data-sort-value="0.93" | 930 m || 
|-id=343 bgcolor=#E9E9E9
| 316343 ||  || — || November 15, 2006 || Kitt Peak || Spacewatch || — || align=right | 1.5 km || 
|-id=344 bgcolor=#E9E9E9
| 316344 ||  || — || September 19, 2001 || Kitt Peak || Spacewatch || — || align=right | 1.8 km || 
|-id=345 bgcolor=#fefefe
| 316345 ||  || — || September 17, 2006 || Kitt Peak || Spacewatch || V || align=right data-sort-value="0.65" | 650 m || 
|-id=346 bgcolor=#E9E9E9
| 316346 ||  || — || August 29, 2005 || Kitt Peak || Spacewatch || AGN || align=right | 1.6 km || 
|-id=347 bgcolor=#fefefe
| 316347 ||  || — || August 18, 2006 || Kitt Peak || Spacewatch || — || align=right data-sort-value="0.94" | 940 m || 
|-id=348 bgcolor=#E9E9E9
| 316348 ||  || — || September 15, 2010 || Kitt Peak || Spacewatch || — || align=right | 1.7 km || 
|-id=349 bgcolor=#E9E9E9
| 316349 ||  || — || February 18, 2008 || Mount Lemmon || Mount Lemmon Survey || — || align=right | 2.6 km || 
|-id=350 bgcolor=#E9E9E9
| 316350 ||  || — || February 9, 2008 || Mount Lemmon || Mount Lemmon Survey || — || align=right | 1.4 km || 
|-id=351 bgcolor=#d6d6d6
| 316351 ||  || — || September 4, 1999 || Catalina || CSS || — || align=right | 4.0 km || 
|-id=352 bgcolor=#E9E9E9
| 316352 ||  || — || October 12, 2002 || Socorro || LINEAR || — || align=right | 1.2 km || 
|-id=353 bgcolor=#d6d6d6
| 316353 ||  || — || September 30, 1999 || Catalina || CSS || TIR || align=right | 3.0 km || 
|-id=354 bgcolor=#d6d6d6
| 316354 ||  || — || December 17, 2001 || Socorro || LINEAR || KAR || align=right | 1.2 km || 
|-id=355 bgcolor=#fefefe
| 316355 ||  || — || December 14, 2003 || Kitt Peak || Spacewatch || — || align=right data-sort-value="0.82" | 820 m || 
|-id=356 bgcolor=#E9E9E9
| 316356 ||  || — || February 28, 2008 || Kitt Peak || Spacewatch || WIT || align=right | 1.1 km || 
|-id=357 bgcolor=#E9E9E9
| 316357 ||  || — || October 15, 2001 || Kitt Peak || Spacewatch || WIT || align=right | 1.0 km || 
|-id=358 bgcolor=#fefefe
| 316358 ||  || — || September 30, 2003 || Kitt Peak || Spacewatch || — || align=right | 1.2 km || 
|-id=359 bgcolor=#d6d6d6
| 316359 ||  || — || September 29, 2005 || Kitt Peak || Spacewatch || — || align=right | 2.2 km || 
|-id=360 bgcolor=#fefefe
| 316360 ||  || — || September 25, 2000 || Anderson Mesa || LONEOS || — || align=right | 1.1 km || 
|-id=361 bgcolor=#E9E9E9
| 316361 ||  || — || July 29, 2000 || Prescott || P. G. Comba || — || align=right | 2.5 km || 
|-id=362 bgcolor=#fefefe
| 316362 ||  || — || October 18, 1995 || Kitt Peak || Spacewatch || — || align=right data-sort-value="0.82" | 820 m || 
|-id=363 bgcolor=#E9E9E9
| 316363 ||  || — || July 4, 2005 || Mount Lemmon || Mount Lemmon Survey || HEN || align=right | 1.3 km || 
|-id=364 bgcolor=#d6d6d6
| 316364 ||  || — || August 29, 2005 || Kitt Peak || Spacewatch || KOR || align=right | 1.5 km || 
|-id=365 bgcolor=#E9E9E9
| 316365 ||  || — || January 17, 2004 || Palomar || NEAT || — || align=right | 1.2 km || 
|-id=366 bgcolor=#d6d6d6
| 316366 ||  || — || October 13, 1999 || Socorro || LINEAR || — || align=right | 3.8 km || 
|-id=367 bgcolor=#d6d6d6
| 316367 ||  || — || March 13, 2007 || Mount Lemmon || Mount Lemmon Survey || HYG || align=right | 2.5 km || 
|-id=368 bgcolor=#d6d6d6
| 316368 ||  || — || September 24, 2005 || Kitt Peak || Spacewatch || KAR || align=right | 1.1 km || 
|-id=369 bgcolor=#d6d6d6
| 316369 ||  || — || September 18, 1999 || Kitt Peak || Spacewatch || — || align=right | 3.0 km || 
|-id=370 bgcolor=#d6d6d6
| 316370 ||  || — || August 6, 2005 || Palomar || NEAT || BRA || align=right | 1.8 km || 
|-id=371 bgcolor=#d6d6d6
| 316371 ||  || — || March 12, 2007 || Mount Lemmon || Mount Lemmon Survey || HYG || align=right | 3.2 km || 
|-id=372 bgcolor=#E9E9E9
| 316372 ||  || — || September 19, 2010 || Kitt Peak || Spacewatch || HEN || align=right | 1.3 km || 
|-id=373 bgcolor=#E9E9E9
| 316373 ||  || — || October 23, 2006 || Catalina || CSS || — || align=right | 1.7 km || 
|-id=374 bgcolor=#E9E9E9
| 316374 ||  || — || March 29, 2008 || Mount Lemmon || Mount Lemmon Survey || NEM || align=right | 2.1 km || 
|-id=375 bgcolor=#E9E9E9
| 316375 ||  || — || November 19, 2006 || Kitt Peak || Spacewatch || HEN || align=right data-sort-value="0.94" | 940 m || 
|-id=376 bgcolor=#E9E9E9
| 316376 ||  || — || September 20, 2001 || Socorro || LINEAR || NEM || align=right | 2.2 km || 
|-id=377 bgcolor=#E9E9E9
| 316377 ||  || — || November 15, 2006 || Kitt Peak || Spacewatch || — || align=right | 1.4 km || 
|-id=378 bgcolor=#fefefe
| 316378 ||  || — || September 19, 2006 || Catalina || CSS || V || align=right data-sort-value="0.90" | 900 m || 
|-id=379 bgcolor=#E9E9E9
| 316379 ||  || — || November 22, 2006 || Kitt Peak || Spacewatch || — || align=right | 1.8 km || 
|-id=380 bgcolor=#fefefe
| 316380 ||  || — || March 3, 1997 || Kitt Peak || Spacewatch || — || align=right data-sort-value="0.87" | 870 m || 
|-id=381 bgcolor=#d6d6d6
| 316381 ||  || — || December 4, 2005 || Kitt Peak || Spacewatch || HYG || align=right | 3.2 km || 
|-id=382 bgcolor=#E9E9E9
| 316382 ||  || — || March 26, 2008 || Mount Lemmon || Mount Lemmon Survey || — || align=right | 1.9 km || 
|-id=383 bgcolor=#E9E9E9
| 316383 ||  || — || April 14, 2004 || Kitt Peak || Spacewatch || — || align=right | 1.8 km || 
|-id=384 bgcolor=#d6d6d6
| 316384 ||  || — || October 28, 2005 || Catalina || CSS || — || align=right | 4.3 km || 
|-id=385 bgcolor=#E9E9E9
| 316385 ||  || — || April 13, 2004 || Kitt Peak || Spacewatch || — || align=right | 1.9 km || 
|-id=386 bgcolor=#E9E9E9
| 316386 ||  || — || February 13, 2008 || Mount Lemmon || Mount Lemmon Survey || — || align=right | 2.0 km || 
|-id=387 bgcolor=#d6d6d6
| 316387 ||  || — || December 2, 1994 || Kitt Peak || Spacewatch || EOS || align=right | 2.3 km || 
|-id=388 bgcolor=#d6d6d6
| 316388 ||  || — || February 10, 2002 || Socorro || LINEAR || KOR || align=right | 1.6 km || 
|-id=389 bgcolor=#E9E9E9
| 316389 ||  || — || March 20, 1999 || Apache Point || SDSS || HOF || align=right | 2.5 km || 
|-id=390 bgcolor=#E9E9E9
| 316390 ||  || — || December 1, 2006 || Kitt Peak || Spacewatch || WIT || align=right | 1.2 km || 
|-id=391 bgcolor=#E9E9E9
| 316391 ||  || — || October 14, 2001 || Apache Point || SDSS || — || align=right | 1.2 km || 
|-id=392 bgcolor=#fefefe
| 316392 ||  || — || November 19, 2003 || Kitt Peak || Spacewatch || — || align=right | 1.0 km || 
|-id=393 bgcolor=#d6d6d6
| 316393 ||  || — || November 10, 1999 || Kitt Peak || Spacewatch || — || align=right | 3.8 km || 
|-id=394 bgcolor=#d6d6d6
| 316394 ||  || — || April 15, 2008 || Mount Lemmon || Mount Lemmon Survey || EOS || align=right | 2.3 km || 
|-id=395 bgcolor=#fefefe
| 316395 ||  || — || March 16, 2005 || Mount Lemmon || Mount Lemmon Survey || MAS || align=right data-sort-value="0.71" | 710 m || 
|-id=396 bgcolor=#d6d6d6
| 316396 ||  || — || October 22, 2005 || Kitt Peak || Spacewatch || — || align=right | 2.5 km || 
|-id=397 bgcolor=#E9E9E9
| 316397 ||  || — || September 23, 2005 || Kitt Peak || Spacewatch || — || align=right | 2.6 km || 
|-id=398 bgcolor=#E9E9E9
| 316398 ||  || — || December 27, 2006 || Mount Lemmon || Mount Lemmon Survey || — || align=right | 2.1 km || 
|-id=399 bgcolor=#E9E9E9
| 316399 ||  || — || January 18, 2008 || Kitt Peak || Spacewatch || — || align=right | 1.1 km || 
|-id=400 bgcolor=#fefefe
| 316400 ||  || — || August 29, 2006 || Kitt Peak || Spacewatch || — || align=right | 1.0 km || 
|}

316401–316500 

|-bgcolor=#d6d6d6
| 316401 ||  || — || September 11, 2005 || Kitt Peak || Spacewatch || KOR || align=right | 1.3 km || 
|-id=402 bgcolor=#E9E9E9
| 316402 ||  || — || March 8, 2008 || Mount Lemmon || Mount Lemmon Survey || WIT || align=right | 1.1 km || 
|-id=403 bgcolor=#E9E9E9
| 316403 ||  || — || November 16, 2006 || Kitt Peak || Spacewatch || HEN || align=right | 1.1 km || 
|-id=404 bgcolor=#fefefe
| 316404 ||  || — || March 19, 1999 || Kitt Peak || Spacewatch || — || align=right data-sort-value="0.64" | 640 m || 
|-id=405 bgcolor=#fefefe
| 316405 ||  || — || March 11, 2005 || Mount Lemmon || Mount Lemmon Survey || V || align=right data-sort-value="0.79" | 790 m || 
|-id=406 bgcolor=#fefefe
| 316406 ||  || — || May 9, 2002 || Socorro || LINEAR || V || align=right data-sort-value="0.98" | 980 m || 
|-id=407 bgcolor=#d6d6d6
| 316407 ||  || — || September 13, 2005 || Kitt Peak || Spacewatch || KAR || align=right | 1.0 km || 
|-id=408 bgcolor=#d6d6d6
| 316408 ||  || — || March 11, 2008 || Kitt Peak || Spacewatch || KOR || align=right | 1.3 km || 
|-id=409 bgcolor=#E9E9E9
| 316409 ||  || — || February 28, 2008 || Mount Lemmon || Mount Lemmon Survey || — || align=right | 1.6 km || 
|-id=410 bgcolor=#d6d6d6
| 316410 ||  || — || August 29, 2005 || Kitt Peak || Spacewatch || K-2 || align=right | 1.3 km || 
|-id=411 bgcolor=#E9E9E9
| 316411 ||  || — || September 23, 2005 || Kitt Peak || Spacewatch || HOF || align=right | 2.5 km || 
|-id=412 bgcolor=#d6d6d6
| 316412 ||  || — || August 27, 2005 || Kitt Peak || Spacewatch || K-2 || align=right | 1.7 km || 
|-id=413 bgcolor=#fefefe
| 316413 ||  || — || March 11, 2005 || Kitt Peak || Spacewatch || MAS || align=right data-sort-value="0.90" | 900 m || 
|-id=414 bgcolor=#E9E9E9
| 316414 ||  || — || April 2, 1995 || Kitt Peak || Spacewatch || — || align=right | 1.6 km || 
|-id=415 bgcolor=#E9E9E9
| 316415 ||  || — || January 29, 2003 || Apache Point || SDSS || HEN || align=right | 1.0 km || 
|-id=416 bgcolor=#E9E9E9
| 316416 ||  || — || October 15, 2001 || Kitt Peak || Spacewatch || — || align=right | 2.1 km || 
|-id=417 bgcolor=#d6d6d6
| 316417 ||  || — || March 14, 2007 || Mount Lemmon || Mount Lemmon Survey || — || align=right | 3.6 km || 
|-id=418 bgcolor=#E9E9E9
| 316418 ||  || — || August 28, 2005 || Kitt Peak || Spacewatch || AST || align=right | 2.0 km || 
|-id=419 bgcolor=#E9E9E9
| 316419 ||  || — || April 3, 2008 || Mount Lemmon || Mount Lemmon Survey || HOF || align=right | 2.2 km || 
|-id=420 bgcolor=#E9E9E9
| 316420 ||  || — || September 12, 2001 || Kitt Peak || Spacewatch || — || align=right | 1.7 km || 
|-id=421 bgcolor=#E9E9E9
| 316421 ||  || — || November 25, 2006 || Kitt Peak || Spacewatch || AGN || align=right | 1.3 km || 
|-id=422 bgcolor=#d6d6d6
| 316422 ||  || — || August 22, 2004 || Kitt Peak || Spacewatch || EOS || align=right | 2.3 km || 
|-id=423 bgcolor=#fefefe
| 316423 ||  || — || April 30, 1997 || Kitt Peak || Spacewatch || — || align=right | 2.8 km || 
|-id=424 bgcolor=#d6d6d6
| 316424 ||  || — || July 30, 2009 || Kitt Peak || Spacewatch || — || align=right | 3.3 km || 
|-id=425 bgcolor=#d6d6d6
| 316425 ||  || — || November 15, 2006 || Mount Lemmon || Mount Lemmon Survey || — || align=right | 2.9 km || 
|-id=426 bgcolor=#E9E9E9
| 316426 ||  || — || November 17, 2001 || Socorro || LINEAR || HNA || align=right | 3.5 km || 
|-id=427 bgcolor=#E9E9E9
| 316427 ||  || — || September 28, 2006 || Mount Lemmon || Mount Lemmon Survey || — || align=right | 1.7 km || 
|-id=428 bgcolor=#d6d6d6
| 316428 ||  || — || February 23, 2007 || Kitt Peak || Spacewatch || — || align=right | 2.6 km || 
|-id=429 bgcolor=#fefefe
| 316429 ||  || — || March 17, 2009 || Catalina || CSS || FLO || align=right data-sort-value="0.62" | 620 m || 
|-id=430 bgcolor=#d6d6d6
| 316430 ||  || — || April 5, 2008 || Kitt Peak || Spacewatch || — || align=right | 3.5 km || 
|-id=431 bgcolor=#C2FFFF
| 316431 ||  || — || October 14, 2010 || Socorro || LINEAR || L4 || align=right | 12 km || 
|-id=432 bgcolor=#fefefe
| 316432 ||  || — || August 21, 2006 || Kitt Peak || Spacewatch || V || align=right data-sort-value="0.83" | 830 m || 
|-id=433 bgcolor=#d6d6d6
| 316433 ||  || — || October 9, 2010 || Mount Lemmon || Mount Lemmon Survey || EOS || align=right | 2.9 km || 
|-id=434 bgcolor=#fefefe
| 316434 ||  || — || September 27, 2006 || Kitt Peak || Spacewatch || — || align=right data-sort-value="0.89" | 890 m || 
|-id=435 bgcolor=#fefefe
| 316435 ||  || — || August 31, 2003 || Socorro || LINEAR || V || align=right data-sort-value="0.93" | 930 m || 
|-id=436 bgcolor=#E9E9E9
| 316436 ||  || — || September 28, 2006 || Kitt Peak || Spacewatch || — || align=right | 1.0 km || 
|-id=437 bgcolor=#d6d6d6
| 316437 ||  || — || July 12, 2009 || Kitt Peak || Spacewatch || EOS || align=right | 3.1 km || 
|-id=438 bgcolor=#E9E9E9
| 316438 ||  || — || September 1, 2005 || Palomar || NEAT || GEF || align=right | 2.1 km || 
|-id=439 bgcolor=#fefefe
| 316439 ||  || — || September 30, 2006 || Catalina || CSS || — || align=right | 1.5 km || 
|-id=440 bgcolor=#d6d6d6
| 316440 ||  || — || December 16, 2000 || Kitt Peak || Spacewatch || — || align=right | 3.5 km || 
|-id=441 bgcolor=#E9E9E9
| 316441 ||  || — || September 30, 2006 || Mount Lemmon || Mount Lemmon Survey || — || align=right | 1.4 km || 
|-id=442 bgcolor=#fefefe
| 316442 ||  || — || February 4, 2005 || Mount Lemmon || Mount Lemmon Survey || FLO || align=right data-sort-value="0.81" | 810 m || 
|-id=443 bgcolor=#fefefe
| 316443 ||  || — || March 11, 2005 || Kitt Peak || Spacewatch || V || align=right data-sort-value="0.85" | 850 m || 
|-id=444 bgcolor=#d6d6d6
| 316444 ||  || — || November 5, 2005 || Kitt Peak || Spacewatch || — || align=right | 3.0 km || 
|-id=445 bgcolor=#d6d6d6
| 316445 ||  || — || December 21, 2005 || Kitt Peak || Spacewatch || HYG || align=right | 3.6 km || 
|-id=446 bgcolor=#C2FFFF
| 316446 ||  || — || February 13, 2002 || Apache Point || SDSS || L4ERY || align=right | 8.4 km || 
|-id=447 bgcolor=#d6d6d6
| 316447 ||  || — || April 12, 2002 || Palomar || NEAT || URS || align=right | 4.2 km || 
|-id=448 bgcolor=#E9E9E9
| 316448 ||  || — || September 3, 2000 || Apache Point || SDSS || — || align=right | 3.0 km || 
|-id=449 bgcolor=#d6d6d6
| 316449 ||  || — || December 1, 2006 || Mount Lemmon || Mount Lemmon Survey || — || align=right | 2.0 km || 
|-id=450 bgcolor=#E9E9E9
| 316450 Changhsiangtung ||  ||  || February 29, 2008 || XuYi || PMO NEO || — || align=right | 2.5 km || 
|-id=451 bgcolor=#E9E9E9
| 316451 ||  || — || February 24, 2008 || Mount Lemmon || Mount Lemmon Survey || — || align=right | 1.4 km || 
|-id=452 bgcolor=#E9E9E9
| 316452 ||  || — || October 30, 2010 || Catalina || CSS || — || align=right | 3.0 km || 
|-id=453 bgcolor=#d6d6d6
| 316453 ||  || — || September 16, 2003 || Kitt Peak || Spacewatch || — || align=right | 4.8 km || 
|-id=454 bgcolor=#E9E9E9
| 316454 ||  || — || August 25, 2005 || Palomar || NEAT || WIT || align=right | 1.7 km || 
|-id=455 bgcolor=#d6d6d6
| 316455 ||  || — || October 28, 2010 || Catalina || CSS || — || align=right | 3.0 km || 
|-id=456 bgcolor=#d6d6d6
| 316456 ||  || — || September 30, 2005 || Kitt Peak || Spacewatch || — || align=right | 2.4 km || 
|-id=457 bgcolor=#E9E9E9
| 316457 ||  || — || September 13, 2005 || Kitt Peak || Spacewatch || — || align=right | 2.6 km || 
|-id=458 bgcolor=#E9E9E9
| 316458 ||  || — || July 18, 2005 || Palomar || NEAT || — || align=right | 2.5 km || 
|-id=459 bgcolor=#fefefe
| 316459 ||  || — || March 19, 2001 || Anderson Mesa || LONEOS || EUT || align=right data-sort-value="0.84" | 840 m || 
|-id=460 bgcolor=#d6d6d6
| 316460 ||  || — || August 15, 2004 || Campo Imperatore || CINEOS || — || align=right | 3.9 km || 
|-id=461 bgcolor=#C2FFFF
| 316461 ||  || — || September 3, 2008 || Kitt Peak || Spacewatch || L4ARK || align=right | 8.0 km || 
|-id=462 bgcolor=#E9E9E9
| 316462 ||  || — || September 19, 2001 || Socorro || LINEAR || — || align=right | 2.2 km || 
|-id=463 bgcolor=#E9E9E9
| 316463 ||  || — || May 28, 2000 || Socorro || LINEAR || — || align=right | 2.6 km || 
|-id=464 bgcolor=#d6d6d6
| 316464 ||  || — || August 8, 2004 || Socorro || LINEAR || — || align=right | 3.7 km || 
|-id=465 bgcolor=#d6d6d6
| 316465 ||  || — || August 11, 2004 || Socorro || LINEAR || TEL || align=right | 2.0 km || 
|-id=466 bgcolor=#d6d6d6
| 316466 ||  || — || November 30, 2005 || Kitt Peak || Spacewatch || — || align=right | 2.9 km || 
|-id=467 bgcolor=#E9E9E9
| 316467 ||  || — || April 15, 1996 || Kitt Peak || Spacewatch || — || align=right | 1.2 km || 
|-id=468 bgcolor=#E9E9E9
| 316468 ||  || — || March 15, 2004 || Kitt Peak || Spacewatch || — || align=right | 1.1 km || 
|-id=469 bgcolor=#E9E9E9
| 316469 ||  || — || October 21, 2001 || Kitt Peak || Spacewatch || — || align=right | 1.5 km || 
|-id=470 bgcolor=#d6d6d6
| 316470 ||  || — || October 8, 1999 || Kitt Peak || Spacewatch || HYG || align=right | 2.6 km || 
|-id=471 bgcolor=#d6d6d6
| 316471 ||  || — || February 11, 2002 || Socorro || LINEAR || — || align=right | 3.3 km || 
|-id=472 bgcolor=#d6d6d6
| 316472 ||  || — || June 17, 2009 || Kitt Peak || Spacewatch || 3:2 || align=right | 3.6 km || 
|-id=473 bgcolor=#d6d6d6
| 316473 ||  || — || November 25, 2005 || Catalina || CSS || — || align=right | 3.4 km || 
|-id=474 bgcolor=#d6d6d6
| 316474 ||  || — || December 4, 1999 || Kitt Peak || Spacewatch || — || align=right | 3.4 km || 
|-id=475 bgcolor=#d6d6d6
| 316475 ||  || — || September 13, 2004 || Anderson Mesa || LONEOS || — || align=right | 3.2 km || 
|-id=476 bgcolor=#d6d6d6
| 316476 ||  || — || March 14, 2007 || Catalina || CSS || — || align=right | 5.4 km || 
|-id=477 bgcolor=#E9E9E9
| 316477 ||  || — || August 21, 2006 || Kitt Peak || Spacewatch || KON || align=right | 3.4 km || 
|-id=478 bgcolor=#d6d6d6
| 316478 ||  || — || September 15, 2004 || Kitt Peak || Spacewatch || — || align=right | 3.4 km || 
|-id=479 bgcolor=#d6d6d6
| 316479 ||  || — || October 25, 2005 || Mount Lemmon || Mount Lemmon Survey || — || align=right | 3.0 km || 
|-id=480 bgcolor=#d6d6d6
| 316480 ||  || — || October 4, 2004 || Kitt Peak || Spacewatch || — || align=right | 3.5 km || 
|-id=481 bgcolor=#d6d6d6
| 316481 ||  || — || September 4, 2010 || Kitt Peak || Spacewatch || VER || align=right | 3.4 km || 
|-id=482 bgcolor=#E9E9E9
| 316482 ||  || — || October 10, 2005 || Kitt Peak || Spacewatch || AGN || align=right | 1.4 km || 
|-id=483 bgcolor=#d6d6d6
| 316483 ||  || — || January 17, 2007 || Mount Lemmon || Mount Lemmon Survey || THM || align=right | 3.0 km || 
|-id=484 bgcolor=#C2FFFF
| 316484 ||  || — || November 4, 2010 || La Sagra || OAM Obs. || L4ERY || align=right | 13 km || 
|-id=485 bgcolor=#d6d6d6
| 316485 ||  || — || January 10, 2007 || Kitt Peak || Spacewatch || — || align=right | 3.1 km || 
|-id=486 bgcolor=#E9E9E9
| 316486 ||  || — || July 13, 2001 || Palomar || NEAT || ADE || align=right | 2.7 km || 
|-id=487 bgcolor=#d6d6d6
| 316487 ||  || — || November 2, 2005 || Mount Lemmon || Mount Lemmon Survey || EOS || align=right | 2.0 km || 
|-id=488 bgcolor=#E9E9E9
| 316488 ||  || — || November 16, 2001 || Kitt Peak || Spacewatch || WIT || align=right | 1.3 km || 
|-id=489 bgcolor=#E9E9E9
| 316489 ||  || — || September 29, 2001 || Palomar || NEAT || — || align=right | 1.9 km || 
|-id=490 bgcolor=#d6d6d6
| 316490 ||  || — || November 1, 1999 || Kitt Peak || Spacewatch || — || align=right | 2.9 km || 
|-id=491 bgcolor=#E9E9E9
| 316491 ||  || — || October 3, 2005 || Kitt Peak || Spacewatch || — || align=right | 2.5 km || 
|-id=492 bgcolor=#d6d6d6
| 316492 ||  || — || October 22, 2003 || Kitt Peak || Spacewatch || 7:4 || align=right | 3.8 km || 
|-id=493 bgcolor=#d6d6d6
| 316493 ||  || — || November 25, 2005 || Kitt Peak || Spacewatch || — || align=right | 2.7 km || 
|-id=494 bgcolor=#E9E9E9
| 316494 ||  || — || September 11, 2001 || Kitt Peak || Spacewatch || — || align=right | 1.9 km || 
|-id=495 bgcolor=#fefefe
| 316495 ||  || — || January 16, 2005 || Kitt Peak || Spacewatch || V || align=right data-sort-value="0.78" | 780 m || 
|-id=496 bgcolor=#d6d6d6
| 316496 ||  || — || November 30, 2005 || Kitt Peak || Spacewatch || — || align=right | 3.0 km || 
|-id=497 bgcolor=#d6d6d6
| 316497 ||  || — || May 5, 2008 || Mount Lemmon || Mount Lemmon Survey || EOS || align=right | 2.5 km || 
|-id=498 bgcolor=#d6d6d6
| 316498 ||  || — || September 7, 1999 || Kitt Peak || Spacewatch || — || align=right | 2.8 km || 
|-id=499 bgcolor=#d6d6d6
| 316499 ||  || — || September 22, 2004 || Desert Eagle || W. K. Y. Yeung || — || align=right | 3.8 km || 
|-id=500 bgcolor=#d6d6d6
| 316500 ||  || — || January 27, 2007 || Mount Lemmon || Mount Lemmon Survey || — || align=right | 2.9 km || 
|}

316501–316600 

|-bgcolor=#E9E9E9
| 316501 ||  || — || October 23, 2006 || Mount Lemmon || Mount Lemmon Survey || — || align=right | 1.4 km || 
|-id=502 bgcolor=#E9E9E9
| 316502 ||  || — || January 29, 2003 || Kitt Peak || Spacewatch || WIT || align=right | 1.1 km || 
|-id=503 bgcolor=#d6d6d6
| 316503 ||  || — || September 16, 2003 || Kitt Peak || Spacewatch || URS || align=right | 5.5 km || 
|-id=504 bgcolor=#d6d6d6
| 316504 ||  || — || October 18, 2004 || Kitt Peak || M. W. Buie || — || align=right | 3.9 km || 
|-id=505 bgcolor=#d6d6d6
| 316505 ||  || — || March 21, 2002 || Kitt Peak || Spacewatch || URS || align=right | 4.7 km || 
|-id=506 bgcolor=#d6d6d6
| 316506 ||  || — || November 5, 2005 || Kitt Peak || Spacewatch || KOR || align=right | 1.6 km || 
|-id=507 bgcolor=#d6d6d6
| 316507 ||  || — || April 11, 2003 || Kitt Peak || Spacewatch || 628 || align=right | 2.3 km || 
|-id=508 bgcolor=#C2FFFF
| 316508 ||  || — || May 2, 2003 || Kitt Peak || Spacewatch || L4 || align=right | 12 km || 
|-id=509 bgcolor=#d6d6d6
| 316509 ||  || — || October 22, 2005 || Kitt Peak || Spacewatch || KOR || align=right | 1.7 km || 
|-id=510 bgcolor=#E9E9E9
| 316510 ||  || — || November 20, 2001 || Socorro || LINEAR || — || align=right | 3.0 km || 
|-id=511 bgcolor=#d6d6d6
| 316511 ||  || — || March 10, 2007 || Mount Lemmon || Mount Lemmon Survey || EOS || align=right | 2.6 km || 
|-id=512 bgcolor=#fefefe
| 316512 ||  || — || February 9, 2005 || Kitt Peak || Spacewatch || V || align=right data-sort-value="0.78" | 780 m || 
|-id=513 bgcolor=#E9E9E9
| 316513 ||  || — || August 30, 2005 || Kitt Peak || Spacewatch || — || align=right | 2.4 km || 
|-id=514 bgcolor=#d6d6d6
| 316514 ||  || — || February 10, 2007 || Mount Lemmon || Mount Lemmon Survey || CHA || align=right | 2.7 km || 
|-id=515 bgcolor=#E9E9E9
| 316515 ||  || — || September 26, 2005 || Kitt Peak || Spacewatch || MRX || align=right | 1.3 km || 
|-id=516 bgcolor=#d6d6d6
| 316516 ||  || — || November 11, 2004 || Kitt Peak || Spacewatch || 7:4 || align=right | 4.7 km || 
|-id=517 bgcolor=#E9E9E9
| 316517 ||  || — || September 29, 2005 || Kitt Peak || Spacewatch || — || align=right | 2.1 km || 
|-id=518 bgcolor=#d6d6d6
| 316518 ||  || — || February 23, 2007 || Catalina || CSS || EOS || align=right | 2.4 km || 
|-id=519 bgcolor=#d6d6d6
| 316519 ||  || — || September 23, 2004 || Kitt Peak || Spacewatch || — || align=right | 3.4 km || 
|-id=520 bgcolor=#d6d6d6
| 316520 ||  || — || January 4, 2006 || Mount Lemmon || Mount Lemmon Survey || — || align=right | 4.4 km || 
|-id=521 bgcolor=#d6d6d6
| 316521 ||  || — || October 1, 2000 || Kitt Peak || Spacewatch || CHA || align=right | 2.5 km || 
|-id=522 bgcolor=#d6d6d6
| 316522 ||  || — || August 18, 2009 || Kitt Peak || Spacewatch || 3:2 || align=right | 4.4 km || 
|-id=523 bgcolor=#d6d6d6
| 316523 ||  || — || August 22, 2004 || Kitt Peak || Spacewatch || — || align=right | 3.6 km || 
|-id=524 bgcolor=#d6d6d6
| 316524 ||  || — || January 1, 2001 || Kitt Peak || Spacewatch || EUP || align=right | 4.5 km || 
|-id=525 bgcolor=#d6d6d6
| 316525 ||  || — || January 5, 2006 || Catalina || CSS || VER || align=right | 3.5 km || 
|-id=526 bgcolor=#d6d6d6
| 316526 ||  || — || December 29, 2005 || Socorro || LINEAR || — || align=right | 3.6 km || 
|-id=527 bgcolor=#d6d6d6
| 316527 Jürgenoberst ||  ||  || February 26, 2001 || Cima Ekar || ADAS || EUP || align=right | 5.1 km || 
|-id=528 bgcolor=#C2FFFF
| 316528 ||  || — || March 18, 2004 || Kitt Peak || Spacewatch || L4 || align=right | 12 km || 
|-id=529 bgcolor=#E9E9E9
| 316529 ||  || — || October 13, 2001 || Kitt Peak || Spacewatch || — || align=right | 1.9 km || 
|-id=530 bgcolor=#fefefe
| 316530 ||  || — || April 4, 2005 || Catalina || CSS || V || align=right data-sort-value="0.92" | 920 m || 
|-id=531 bgcolor=#d6d6d6
| 316531 ||  || — || September 7, 2004 || Kitt Peak || Spacewatch || EOS || align=right | 1.6 km || 
|-id=532 bgcolor=#d6d6d6
| 316532 ||  || — || January 27, 2007 || Kitt Peak || Spacewatch || — || align=right | 3.0 km || 
|-id=533 bgcolor=#d6d6d6
| 316533 ||  || — || April 25, 2007 || Kitt Peak || Spacewatch || 7:4 || align=right | 4.9 km || 
|-id=534 bgcolor=#d6d6d6
| 316534 ||  || — || October 8, 2004 || Kitt Peak || Spacewatch || — || align=right | 3.0 km || 
|-id=535 bgcolor=#d6d6d6
| 316535 ||  || — || October 25, 2005 || Mount Lemmon || Mount Lemmon Survey || KOR || align=right | 1.9 km || 
|-id=536 bgcolor=#C2FFFF
| 316536 ||  || — || November 27, 1998 || Kitt Peak || Spacewatch || L4 || align=right | 6.8 km || 
|-id=537 bgcolor=#C2FFFF
| 316537 ||  || — || September 27, 2009 || Mount Lemmon || Mount Lemmon Survey || L4ARK || align=right | 10 km || 
|-id=538 bgcolor=#C2FFFF
| 316538 ||  || — || November 2, 2010 || Kitt Peak || Spacewatch || L4 || align=right | 12 km || 
|-id=539 bgcolor=#d6d6d6
| 316539 ||  || — || August 7, 2008 || Kitt Peak || Spacewatch || SHU3:2 || align=right | 6.4 km || 
|-id=540 bgcolor=#E9E9E9
| 316540 ||  || — || October 14, 1996 || Xinglong || SCAP || AGN || align=right | 1.5 km || 
|-id=541 bgcolor=#d6d6d6
| 316541 ||  || — || March 30, 2008 || Kitt Peak || Spacewatch || HYG || align=right | 3.2 km || 
|-id=542 bgcolor=#d6d6d6
| 316542 ||  || — || October 21, 2003 || Kitt Peak || Spacewatch || 7:4 || align=right | 5.1 km || 
|-id=543 bgcolor=#E9E9E9
| 316543 ||  || — || August 10, 2010 || Kitt Peak || Spacewatch || — || align=right | 2.2 km || 
|-id=544 bgcolor=#E9E9E9
| 316544 ||  || — || April 1, 2008 || Mount Lemmon || Mount Lemmon Survey || — || align=right | 2.5 km || 
|-id=545 bgcolor=#E9E9E9
| 316545 ||  || — || August 28, 2005 || Kitt Peak || Spacewatch || — || align=right | 2.2 km || 
|-id=546 bgcolor=#d6d6d6
| 316546 ||  || — || April 29, 2008 || Mount Lemmon || Mount Lemmon Survey || — || align=right | 3.4 km || 
|-id=547 bgcolor=#d6d6d6
| 316547 ||  || — || October 15, 2004 || Mount Lemmon || Mount Lemmon Survey || — || align=right | 5.3 km || 
|-id=548 bgcolor=#d6d6d6
| 316548 ||  || — || July 19, 2009 || Siding Spring || SSS || URS || align=right | 5.3 km || 
|-id=549 bgcolor=#d6d6d6
| 316549 ||  || — || October 9, 1993 || La Silla || E. W. Elst || EOS || align=right | 2.8 km || 
|-id=550 bgcolor=#C2FFFF
| 316550 ||  || — || January 17, 2010 || WISE || WISE || L4 || align=right | 14 km || 
|-id=551 bgcolor=#C2FFFF
| 316551 ||  || — || August 24, 2008 || Kitt Peak || Spacewatch || L4ERY || align=right | 8.3 km || 
|-id=552 bgcolor=#C2FFFF
| 316552 ||  || — || April 7, 2003 || Kitt Peak || Spacewatch || L4ERY || align=right | 9.4 km || 
|-id=553 bgcolor=#C2FFFF
| 316553 ||  || — || October 14, 2009 || La Sagra || OAM Obs. || L4 || align=right | 14 km || 
|-id=554 bgcolor=#d6d6d6
| 316554 ||  || — || January 31, 2006 || Kitt Peak || Spacewatch || — || align=right | 2.2 km || 
|-id=555 bgcolor=#d6d6d6
| 316555 ||  || — || September 21, 2008 || Mount Lemmon || Mount Lemmon Survey || EUP || align=right | 4.1 km || 
|-id=556 bgcolor=#d6d6d6
| 316556 ||  || — || October 17, 2003 || Kitt Peak || Spacewatch || EOS || align=right | 2.7 km || 
|-id=557 bgcolor=#d6d6d6
| 316557 ||  || — || April 25, 2001 || Anderson Mesa || LONEOS || — || align=right | 3.8 km || 
|-id=558 bgcolor=#fefefe
| 316558 ||  || — || April 5, 2000 || Socorro || LINEAR || MAS || align=right | 1.00 km || 
|-id=559 bgcolor=#E9E9E9
| 316559 ||  || — || September 18, 1995 || Kitt Peak || Spacewatch || — || align=right | 2.5 km || 
|-id=560 bgcolor=#fefefe
| 316560 ||  || — || October 1, 2005 || Mount Lemmon || Mount Lemmon Survey || — || align=right | 1.0 km || 
|-id=561 bgcolor=#fefefe
| 316561 ||  || — || October 17, 2009 || Catalina || CSS || — || align=right | 1.1 km || 
|-id=562 bgcolor=#E9E9E9
| 316562 ||  || — || October 16, 1999 || Kitt Peak || Spacewatch || — || align=right | 2.4 km || 
|-id=563 bgcolor=#E9E9E9
| 316563 ||  || — || May 6, 2002 || Kitt Peak || Spacewatch || DOR || align=right | 3.3 km || 
|-id=564 bgcolor=#E9E9E9
| 316564 ||  || — || February 13, 2002 || Kitt Peak || Spacewatch || — || align=right | 1.4 km || 
|-id=565 bgcolor=#d6d6d6
| 316565 ||  || — || February 24, 2006 || Mount Lemmon || Mount Lemmon Survey || — || align=right | 2.7 km || 
|-id=566 bgcolor=#E9E9E9
| 316566 ||  || — || December 10, 2009 || Mount Lemmon || Mount Lemmon Survey || HOF || align=right | 3.2 km || 
|-id=567 bgcolor=#d6d6d6
| 316567 ||  || — || November 8, 2008 || Kitt Peak || Spacewatch || — || align=right | 4.9 km || 
|-id=568 bgcolor=#fefefe
| 316568 ||  || — || February 15, 2007 || Catalina || CSS || — || align=right | 1.0 km || 
|-id=569 bgcolor=#fefefe
| 316569 ||  || — || October 30, 2005 || Mount Lemmon || Mount Lemmon Survey || FLO || align=right data-sort-value="0.67" | 670 m || 
|-id=570 bgcolor=#E9E9E9
| 316570 ||  || — || September 12, 2007 || Catalina || CSS || — || align=right | 1.8 km || 
|-id=571 bgcolor=#E9E9E9
| 316571 ||  || — || August 20, 2006 || Palomar || NEAT || — || align=right | 2.0 km || 
|-id=572 bgcolor=#d6d6d6
| 316572 ||  || — || March 10, 1997 || Kitt Peak || Spacewatch || — || align=right | 2.9 km || 
|-id=573 bgcolor=#d6d6d6
| 316573 ||  || — || September 19, 2006 || Catalina || CSS || EOS || align=right | 2.8 km || 
|-id=574 bgcolor=#d6d6d6
| 316574 ||  || — || September 27, 2006 || Catalina || CSS || — || align=right | 4.2 km || 
|-id=575 bgcolor=#d6d6d6
| 316575 ||  || — || August 1, 2000 || Cerro Tololo || M. W. Buie || — || align=right | 2.9 km || 
|-id=576 bgcolor=#fefefe
| 316576 ||  || — || December 30, 2008 || Kitt Peak || Spacewatch || NYS || align=right data-sort-value="0.96" | 960 m || 
|-id=577 bgcolor=#fefefe
| 316577 ||  || — || February 7, 2002 || Kitt Peak || Spacewatch || V || align=right data-sort-value="0.66" | 660 m || 
|-id=578 bgcolor=#fefefe
| 316578 ||  || — || October 11, 2004 || Kitt Peak || Spacewatch || — || align=right | 2.3 km || 
|-id=579 bgcolor=#E9E9E9
| 316579 ||  || — || August 28, 2006 || Kitt Peak || Spacewatch || — || align=right | 2.7 km || 
|-id=580 bgcolor=#d6d6d6
| 316580 ||  || — || September 8, 2001 || Socorro || LINEAR || CHA || align=right | 2.3 km || 
|-id=581 bgcolor=#d6d6d6
| 316581 ||  || — || August 26, 2000 || Socorro || LINEAR || — || align=right | 3.9 km || 
|-id=582 bgcolor=#d6d6d6
| 316582 ||  || — || March 24, 2003 || Kitt Peak || Spacewatch || — || align=right | 3.4 km || 
|-id=583 bgcolor=#d6d6d6
| 316583 ||  || — || January 8, 2002 || Kitt Peak || Spacewatch || — || align=right | 2.7 km || 
|-id=584 bgcolor=#E9E9E9
| 316584 ||  || — || March 17, 2004 || Catalina || CSS || — || align=right | 4.3 km || 
|-id=585 bgcolor=#d6d6d6
| 316585 ||  || — || September 27, 2006 || Mount Lemmon || Mount Lemmon Survey || — || align=right | 3.6 km || 
|-id=586 bgcolor=#E9E9E9
| 316586 ||  || — || September 14, 2010 || Piszkéstető || K. Sárneczky || — || align=right | 3.7 km || 
|-id=587 bgcolor=#E9E9E9
| 316587 ||  || — || October 15, 2002 || Palomar || NEAT || — || align=right | 1.9 km || 
|-id=588 bgcolor=#fefefe
| 316588 ||  || — || March 15, 2002 || Kitt Peak || Spacewatch || — || align=right | 1.6 km || 
|-id=589 bgcolor=#d6d6d6
| 316589 ||  || — || August 16, 2004 || Siding Spring || SSS || — || align=right | 5.1 km || 
|-id=590 bgcolor=#fefefe
| 316590 ||  || — || January 25, 2009 || Catalina || CSS || — || align=right | 1.3 km || 
|-id=591 bgcolor=#d6d6d6
| 316591 ||  || — || September 23, 2000 || Anderson Mesa || LONEOS || — || align=right | 3.6 km || 
|-id=592 bgcolor=#d6d6d6
| 316592 ||  || — || April 16, 2004 || Socorro || LINEAR || FIR || align=right | 4.9 km || 
|-id=593 bgcolor=#fefefe
| 316593 ||  || — || August 25, 2001 || Socorro || LINEAR || — || align=right data-sort-value="0.77" | 770 m || 
|-id=594 bgcolor=#E9E9E9
| 316594 ||  || — || November 15, 1998 || Kitt Peak || Spacewatch || — || align=right | 4.1 km || 
|-id=595 bgcolor=#d6d6d6
| 316595 ||  || — || September 29, 2005 || Kitt Peak || Spacewatch || THM || align=right | 2.3 km || 
|-id=596 bgcolor=#d6d6d6
| 316596 ||  || — || November 20, 2006 || Mount Lemmon || Mount Lemmon Survey || — || align=right | 4.1 km || 
|-id=597 bgcolor=#E9E9E9
| 316597 ||  || — || November 26, 1998 || Anderson Mesa || LONEOS || — || align=right | 4.0 km || 
|-id=598 bgcolor=#d6d6d6
| 316598 ||  || — || February 29, 2008 || XuYi || PMO NEO || — || align=right | 4.4 km || 
|-id=599 bgcolor=#d6d6d6
| 316599 ||  || — || August 6, 2005 || Palomar || NEAT || — || align=right | 2.6 km || 
|-id=600 bgcolor=#E9E9E9
| 316600 ||  || — || May 14, 2005 || Mount Lemmon || Mount Lemmon Survey || — || align=right | 2.1 km || 
|}

316601–316700 

|-bgcolor=#E9E9E9
| 316601 ||  || — || December 27, 1999 || Kitt Peak || Spacewatch || — || align=right | 1.5 km || 
|-id=602 bgcolor=#d6d6d6
| 316602 ||  || — || October 18, 1995 || Kitt Peak || Spacewatch || — || align=right | 3.5 km || 
|-id=603 bgcolor=#E9E9E9
| 316603 ||  || — || September 12, 2001 || Kitt Peak || Spacewatch || — || align=right | 2.9 km || 
|-id=604 bgcolor=#d6d6d6
| 316604 ||  || — || June 4, 2003 || Kitt Peak || Spacewatch || ULA7:4 || align=right | 6.6 km || 
|-id=605 bgcolor=#E9E9E9
| 316605 ||  || — || November 16, 2006 || Mount Lemmon || Mount Lemmon Survey || HOF || align=right | 2.8 km || 
|-id=606 bgcolor=#E9E9E9
| 316606 ||  || — || December 15, 1998 || Caussols || ODAS || — || align=right | 2.0 km || 
|-id=607 bgcolor=#d6d6d6
| 316607 ||  || — || October 12, 2005 || Kitt Peak || Spacewatch || — || align=right | 3.5 km || 
|-id=608 bgcolor=#d6d6d6
| 316608 ||  || — || September 28, 2006 || Mount Lemmon || Mount Lemmon Survey || KOR || align=right | 2.0 km || 
|-id=609 bgcolor=#fefefe
| 316609 ||  || — || October 7, 2004 || Socorro || LINEAR || — || align=right | 1.1 km || 
|-id=610 bgcolor=#E9E9E9
| 316610 ||  || — || September 16, 2006 || Catalina || CSS || — || align=right | 2.8 km || 
|-id=611 bgcolor=#E9E9E9
| 316611 ||  || — || April 26, 2006 || Siding Spring || SSS || — || align=right | 2.0 km || 
|-id=612 bgcolor=#fefefe
| 316612 ||  || — || May 18, 2002 || Palomar || NEAT || V || align=right data-sort-value="0.93" | 930 m || 
|-id=613 bgcolor=#E9E9E9
| 316613 ||  || — || October 9, 2002 || Socorro || LINEAR || MIS || align=right | 2.8 km || 
|-id=614 bgcolor=#fefefe
| 316614 ||  || — || May 22, 2006 || Kitt Peak || Spacewatch || — || align=right | 1.2 km || 
|-id=615 bgcolor=#E9E9E9
| 316615 ||  || — || October 7, 2002 || Haleakala || NEAT || — || align=right | 2.0 km || 
|-id=616 bgcolor=#E9E9E9
| 316616 ||  || — || September 24, 1960 || Palomar || PLS || — || align=right | 1.6 km || 
|-id=617 bgcolor=#C2FFFF
| 316617 ||  || — || September 16, 2009 || Catalina || CSS || L4 || align=right | 13 km || 
|-id=618 bgcolor=#d6d6d6
| 316618 ||  || — || May 3, 2003 || Kitt Peak || Spacewatch || — || align=right | 3.1 km || 
|-id=619 bgcolor=#d6d6d6
| 316619 ||  || — || October 29, 2005 || Catalina || CSS || — || align=right | 4.4 km || 
|-id=620 bgcolor=#fefefe
| 316620 ||  || — || March 26, 2001 || Kitt Peak || Spacewatch || NYS || align=right data-sort-value="0.54" | 540 m || 
|-id=621 bgcolor=#d6d6d6
| 316621 ||  || — || August 31, 2005 || Kitt Peak || Spacewatch || THM || align=right | 2.2 km || 
|-id=622 bgcolor=#E9E9E9
| 316622 ||  || — || September 28, 2006 || Catalina || CSS || GEF || align=right | 1.7 km || 
|-id=623 bgcolor=#E9E9E9
| 316623 ||  || — || November 4, 2002 || Kitt Peak || Spacewatch || NEM || align=right | 2.8 km || 
|-id=624 bgcolor=#C2FFFF
| 316624 ||  || — || January 20, 2001 || Haleakala || NEAT || L4 || align=right | 16 km || 
|-id=625 bgcolor=#E9E9E9
| 316625 ||  || — || July 5, 2005 || Kitt Peak || Spacewatch || — || align=right | 2.4 km || 
|-id=626 bgcolor=#C2FFFF
| 316626 ||  || — || October 16, 1998 || Kitt Peak || Spacewatch || L4 || align=right | 10 km || 
|-id=627 bgcolor=#fefefe
| 316627 ||  || — || April 5, 2003 || Kitt Peak || Spacewatch || V || align=right data-sort-value="0.75" | 750 m || 
|-id=628 bgcolor=#E9E9E9
| 316628 ||  || — || December 6, 2002 || Socorro || LINEAR || — || align=right | 2.6 km || 
|-id=629 bgcolor=#C2FFFF
| 316629 ||  || — || June 19, 2007 || Kitt Peak || Spacewatch || L4 || align=right | 14 km || 
|-id=630 bgcolor=#E9E9E9
| 316630 ||  || — || November 29, 1995 || Kitt Peak || Spacewatch || EUN || align=right | 1.8 km || 
|-id=631 bgcolor=#d6d6d6
| 316631 ||  || — || October 30, 2005 || Mount Lemmon || Mount Lemmon Survey || 7:4 || align=right | 5.8 km || 
|-id=632 bgcolor=#E9E9E9
| 316632 ||  || — || August 17, 2002 || Haleakala || NEAT || — || align=right | 2.3 km || 
|-id=633 bgcolor=#d6d6d6
| 316633 ||  || — || October 20, 2006 || Kitt Peak || Spacewatch || KOR || align=right | 1.6 km || 
|-id=634 bgcolor=#E9E9E9
| 316634 ||  || — || December 29, 2003 || Kitt Peak || Spacewatch || — || align=right data-sort-value="0.91" | 910 m || 
|-id=635 bgcolor=#E9E9E9
| 316635 ||  || — || May 26, 2006 || Mount Lemmon || Mount Lemmon Survey || — || align=right | 1.8 km || 
|-id=636 bgcolor=#fefefe
| 316636 ||  || — || December 24, 1997 || Xinglong || SCAP || H || align=right | 1.3 km || 
|-id=637 bgcolor=#E9E9E9
| 316637 ||  || — || September 27, 2006 || Catalina || CSS || JUN || align=right | 1.4 km || 
|-id=638 bgcolor=#fefefe
| 316638 ||  || — || May 22, 2006 || Kitt Peak || Spacewatch || V || align=right data-sort-value="0.79" | 790 m || 
|-id=639 bgcolor=#d6d6d6
| 316639 ||  || — || October 25, 2005 || Kitt Peak || Spacewatch || — || align=right | 4.7 km || 
|-id=640 bgcolor=#d6d6d6
| 316640 ||  || — || October 26, 2005 || Kitt Peak || Spacewatch || EOS || align=right | 2.3 km || 
|-id=641 bgcolor=#d6d6d6
| 316641 ||  || — || November 5, 2005 || Mount Lemmon || Mount Lemmon Survey || — || align=right | 2.7 km || 
|-id=642 bgcolor=#fefefe
| 316642 ||  || — || September 28, 2003 || Anderson Mesa || LONEOS || — || align=right | 2.2 km || 
|-id=643 bgcolor=#fefefe
| 316643 ||  || — || March 10, 2005 || Catalina || CSS || — || align=right | 1.3 km || 
|-id=644 bgcolor=#d6d6d6
| 316644 ||  || — || August 25, 1995 || Kitt Peak || Spacewatch || — || align=right | 3.5 km || 
|-id=645 bgcolor=#E9E9E9
| 316645 ||  || — || February 13, 2004 || Kitt Peak || Spacewatch || — || align=right | 1.2 km || 
|-id=646 bgcolor=#fefefe
| 316646 ||  || — || September 26, 2003 || Apache Point || SDSS || — || align=right data-sort-value="0.85" | 850 m || 
|-id=647 bgcolor=#d6d6d6
| 316647 ||  || — || January 28, 1996 || Kitt Peak || Spacewatch || — || align=right | 2.5 km || 
|-id=648 bgcolor=#d6d6d6
| 316648 ||  || — || November 22, 2005 || Kitt Peak || Spacewatch || — || align=right | 4.6 km || 
|-id=649 bgcolor=#E9E9E9
| 316649 ||  || — || September 29, 1973 || Palomar || PLS || — || align=right | 2.2 km || 
|-id=650 bgcolor=#FA8072
| 316650 || 1987 UL || — || October 17, 1987 || Palomar || C. S. Shoemaker || — || align=right | 1.9 km || 
|-id=651 bgcolor=#FA8072
| 316651 || 1990 OL || — || July 22, 1990 || Palomar || E. F. Helin || — || align=right | 2.6 km || 
|-id=652 bgcolor=#fefefe
| 316652 ||  || — || March 2, 1992 || La Silla || UESAC || — || align=right | 1.0 km || 
|-id=653 bgcolor=#fefefe
| 316653 ||  || — || January 21, 1993 || Kitt Peak || Spacewatch || — || align=right | 1.1 km || 
|-id=654 bgcolor=#E9E9E9
| 316654 ||  || — || July 12, 1993 || La Silla || E. W. Elst || — || align=right | 1.9 km || 
|-id=655 bgcolor=#d6d6d6
| 316655 ||  || — || October 9, 1993 || Kitt Peak || Spacewatch || — || align=right | 3.7 km || 
|-id=656 bgcolor=#d6d6d6
| 316656 ||  || — || October 15, 1993 || Kitt Peak || Spacewatch || — || align=right | 4.6 km || 
|-id=657 bgcolor=#fefefe
| 316657 ||  || — || October 9, 1993 || La Silla || E. W. Elst || — || align=right data-sort-value="0.94" | 940 m || 
|-id=658 bgcolor=#E9E9E9
| 316658 ||  || — || October 10, 1993 || La Silla || E. W. Elst || — || align=right | 1.9 km || 
|-id=659 bgcolor=#E9E9E9
| 316659 ||  || — || October 20, 1993 || Kitt Peak || Spacewatch || — || align=right | 1.5 km || 
|-id=660 bgcolor=#E9E9E9
| 316660 ||  || — || December 16, 1993 || Kitt Peak || Spacewatch || — || align=right | 1.5 km || 
|-id=661 bgcolor=#fefefe
| 316661 ||  || — || May 3, 1994 || Kitt Peak || Spacewatch || V || align=right data-sort-value="0.75" | 750 m || 
|-id=662 bgcolor=#fefefe
| 316662 ||  || — || September 27, 1994 || Kitt Peak || Spacewatch || NYS || align=right data-sort-value="0.85" | 850 m || 
|-id=663 bgcolor=#d6d6d6
| 316663 ||  || — || September 29, 1994 || Kitt Peak || Spacewatch || — || align=right | 3.4 km || 
|-id=664 bgcolor=#fefefe
| 316664 ||  || — || January 29, 1995 || Kitt Peak || Spacewatch || NYS || align=right data-sort-value="0.54" | 540 m || 
|-id=665 bgcolor=#fefefe
| 316665 ||  || — || February 24, 1995 || Kitt Peak || Spacewatch || FLO || align=right data-sort-value="0.54" | 540 m || 
|-id=666 bgcolor=#d6d6d6
| 316666 ||  || — || February 25, 1995 || Kitt Peak || Spacewatch || — || align=right | 3.6 km || 
|-id=667 bgcolor=#d6d6d6
| 316667 ||  || — || March 23, 1995 || Kitt Peak || Spacewatch || — || align=right | 4.2 km || 
|-id=668 bgcolor=#fefefe
| 316668 ||  || — || July 22, 1995 || Kitt Peak || Spacewatch || — || align=right data-sort-value="0.92" | 920 m || 
|-id=669 bgcolor=#E9E9E9
| 316669 ||  || — || July 26, 1995 || Kitt Peak || Spacewatch || MRX || align=right | 1.1 km || 
|-id=670 bgcolor=#E9E9E9
| 316670 ||  || — || August 27, 1995 || Kitt Peak || Spacewatch || — || align=right | 1.7 km || 
|-id=671 bgcolor=#E9E9E9
| 316671 || 1995 RN || — || September 1, 1995 || Haleakala || AMOS || — || align=right | 2.6 km || 
|-id=672 bgcolor=#E9E9E9
| 316672 ||  || — || September 18, 1995 || Kitt Peak || Spacewatch || — || align=right | 1.0 km || 
|-id=673 bgcolor=#fefefe
| 316673 ||  || — || September 19, 1995 || Kitt Peak || Spacewatch || V || align=right data-sort-value="0.55" | 550 m || 
|-id=674 bgcolor=#d6d6d6
| 316674 ||  || — || September 19, 1995 || Kitt Peak || Spacewatch || KOR || align=right | 1.9 km || 
|-id=675 bgcolor=#E9E9E9
| 316675 ||  || — || September 26, 1995 || Kitt Peak || Spacewatch || — || align=right | 1.8 km || 
|-id=676 bgcolor=#fefefe
| 316676 ||  || — || September 25, 1995 || Kitt Peak || Spacewatch || FLO || align=right data-sort-value="0.76" | 760 m || 
|-id=677 bgcolor=#d6d6d6
| 316677 ||  || — || October 15, 1995 || Kitt Peak || Spacewatch || — || align=right | 2.7 km || 
|-id=678 bgcolor=#fefefe
| 316678 ||  || — || October 17, 1995 || Kitt Peak || Spacewatch || — || align=right | 1.1 km || 
|-id=679 bgcolor=#d6d6d6
| 316679 ||  || — || October 17, 1995 || Kitt Peak || Spacewatch || — || align=right | 2.7 km || 
|-id=680 bgcolor=#d6d6d6
| 316680 ||  || — || October 19, 1995 || Kitt Peak || Spacewatch || KOR || align=right | 1.4 km || 
|-id=681 bgcolor=#fefefe
| 316681 ||  || — || October 17, 1995 || Kitt Peak || Spacewatch || FLO || align=right data-sort-value="0.84" | 840 m || 
|-id=682 bgcolor=#fefefe
| 316682 ||  || — || October 24, 1995 || Kitt Peak || Spacewatch || — || align=right data-sort-value="0.79" | 790 m || 
|-id=683 bgcolor=#fefefe
| 316683 ||  || — || October 19, 1995 || Kitt Peak || Spacewatch || MAS || align=right data-sort-value="0.85" | 850 m || 
|-id=684 bgcolor=#E9E9E9
| 316684 ||  || — || November 15, 1995 || Kitt Peak || Spacewatch || — || align=right | 1.1 km || 
|-id=685 bgcolor=#d6d6d6
| 316685 ||  || — || January 13, 1996 || Kitt Peak || Spacewatch || — || align=right | 2.9 km || 
|-id=686 bgcolor=#E9E9E9
| 316686 ||  || — || January 21, 1996 || Kitt Peak || Spacewatch || WIT || align=right | 1.1 km || 
|-id=687 bgcolor=#FA8072
| 316687 ||  || — || January 27, 1996 || Kitt Peak || Spacewatch || — || align=right | 1.0 km || 
|-id=688 bgcolor=#d6d6d6
| 316688 ||  || — || January 16, 1996 || Kitt Peak || Spacewatch || — || align=right | 3.2 km || 
|-id=689 bgcolor=#E9E9E9
| 316689 ||  || — || March 11, 1996 || Kitt Peak || Spacewatch || — || align=right | 2.3 km || 
|-id=690 bgcolor=#E9E9E9
| 316690 ||  || — || March 11, 1996 || Kitt Peak || Spacewatch || — || align=right | 2.3 km || 
|-id=691 bgcolor=#fefefe
| 316691 ||  || — || April 11, 1996 || Kitt Peak || Spacewatch || — || align=right data-sort-value="0.75" | 750 m || 
|-id=692 bgcolor=#C2FFFF
| 316692 ||  || — || April 11, 1996 || Kitt Peak || Spacewatch || L5 || align=right | 12 km || 
|-id=693 bgcolor=#C2FFFF
| 316693 ||  || — || May 10, 1996 || Kitt Peak || Spacewatch || L5 || align=right | 11 km || 
|-id=694 bgcolor=#fefefe
| 316694 ||  || — || October 3, 1996 || Xinglong || SCAP || — || align=right | 1.2 km || 
|-id=695 bgcolor=#FFC2E0
| 316695 ||  || — || October 13, 1996 || Haleakala || NEAT || AMO || align=right data-sort-value="0.60" | 600 m || 
|-id=696 bgcolor=#fefefe
| 316696 ||  || — || October 4, 1996 || Kitt Peak || Spacewatch || ERI || align=right | 2.0 km || 
|-id=697 bgcolor=#d6d6d6
| 316697 ||  || — || October 7, 1996 || Kitt Peak || Spacewatch || — || align=right | 3.7 km || 
|-id=698 bgcolor=#fefefe
| 316698 ||  || — || October 7, 1996 || Kitt Peak || Spacewatch || — || align=right data-sort-value="0.83" | 830 m || 
|-id=699 bgcolor=#d6d6d6
| 316699 ||  || — || October 10, 1996 || Kitt Peak || Spacewatch || — || align=right | 3.4 km || 
|-id=700 bgcolor=#E9E9E9
| 316700 ||  || — || November 3, 1996 || Kitt Peak || Spacewatch || — || align=right | 2.6 km || 
|}

316701–316800 

|-bgcolor=#fefefe
| 316701 ||  || — || November 5, 1996 || Kitt Peak || Spacewatch || MAS || align=right data-sort-value="0.62" | 620 m || 
|-id=702 bgcolor=#fefefe
| 316702 ||  || — || November 6, 1996 || Kitt Peak || Spacewatch || V || align=right data-sort-value="0.86" | 860 m || 
|-id=703 bgcolor=#E9E9E9
| 316703 ||  || — || November 10, 1996 || Kitt Peak || Spacewatch || — || align=right | 1.2 km || 
|-id=704 bgcolor=#fefefe
| 316704 ||  || — || December 2, 1996 || Kitt Peak || Spacewatch || H || align=right | 1.1 km || 
|-id=705 bgcolor=#fefefe
| 316705 ||  || — || December 4, 1996 || Kitt Peak || Spacewatch || V || align=right data-sort-value="0.62" | 620 m || 
|-id=706 bgcolor=#fefefe
| 316706 ||  || — || December 12, 1996 || Prescott || P. G. Comba || NYS || align=right data-sort-value="0.80" | 800 m || 
|-id=707 bgcolor=#fefefe
| 316707 ||  || — || February 3, 1997 || Kitt Peak || Spacewatch || — || align=right data-sort-value="0.89" | 890 m || 
|-id=708 bgcolor=#E9E9E9
| 316708 ||  || — || March 4, 1997 || Kitt Peak || Spacewatch || — || align=right | 1.4 km || 
|-id=709 bgcolor=#d6d6d6
| 316709 POSS ||  ||  || March 6, 1997 || Palomar || A. Lowe || — || align=right | 3.2 km || 
|-id=710 bgcolor=#fefefe
| 316710 ||  || — || April 7, 1997 || Kitt Peak || Spacewatch || NYS || align=right data-sort-value="0.81" | 810 m || 
|-id=711 bgcolor=#fefefe
| 316711 ||  || — || April 7, 1997 || Kitt Peak || Spacewatch || H || align=right data-sort-value="0.75" | 750 m || 
|-id=712 bgcolor=#E9E9E9
| 316712 ||  || — || September 25, 1997 || Farra d'Isonzo || Farra d'Isonzo || RAF || align=right | 1.2 km || 
|-id=713 bgcolor=#fefefe
| 316713 ||  || — || September 23, 1997 || Kitt Peak || Spacewatch || — || align=right | 1.0 km || 
|-id=714 bgcolor=#fefefe
| 316714 ||  || — || September 28, 1997 || Kitt Peak || Spacewatch || FLO || align=right data-sort-value="0.62" | 620 m || 
|-id=715 bgcolor=#E9E9E9
| 316715 ||  || — || October 3, 1997 || Kitt Peak || Spacewatch || — || align=right | 1.3 km || 
|-id=716 bgcolor=#fefefe
| 316716 ||  || — || November 23, 1997 || Kitt Peak || Spacewatch || V || align=right data-sort-value="0.65" | 650 m || 
|-id=717 bgcolor=#E9E9E9
| 316717 ||  || — || November 25, 1997 || Kitt Peak || Spacewatch || — || align=right | 1.4 km || 
|-id=718 bgcolor=#E9E9E9
| 316718 ||  || — || December 3, 1997 || Caussols || ODAS || — || align=right | 1.9 km || 
|-id=719 bgcolor=#E9E9E9
| 316719 ||  || — || December 31, 1997 || Oizumi || T. Kobayashi || — || align=right | 2.2 km || 
|-id=720 bgcolor=#FA8072
| 316720 ||  || — || January 24, 1998 || Haleakala || NEAT || unusual || align=right | 6.6 km || 
|-id=721 bgcolor=#E9E9E9
| 316721 ||  || — || January 22, 1998 || Kitt Peak || Spacewatch || — || align=right | 1.5 km || 
|-id=722 bgcolor=#fefefe
| 316722 ||  || — || February 23, 1998 || Kitt Peak || Spacewatch || FLO || align=right | 1.0 km || 
|-id=723 bgcolor=#E9E9E9
| 316723 ||  || — || February 22, 1998 || Kitt Peak || Spacewatch || — || align=right | 1.9 km || 
|-id=724 bgcolor=#fefefe
| 316724 ||  || — || March 20, 1998 || Socorro || LINEAR || PHO || align=right | 1.6 km || 
|-id=725 bgcolor=#fefefe
| 316725 ||  || — || April 19, 1998 || Kitt Peak || Spacewatch || V || align=right data-sort-value="0.82" | 820 m || 
|-id=726 bgcolor=#fefefe
| 316726 ||  || — || April 23, 1998 || Socorro || LINEAR || PHO || align=right | 1.2 km || 
|-id=727 bgcolor=#d6d6d6
| 316727 ||  || — || August 30, 1998 || Kitt Peak || Spacewatch || VER || align=right | 2.9 km || 
|-id=728 bgcolor=#d6d6d6
| 316728 ||  || — || August 26, 1998 || Kitt Peak || Spacewatch || EOS || align=right | 2.3 km || 
|-id=729 bgcolor=#E9E9E9
| 316729 ||  || — || August 19, 1998 || Socorro || LINEAR || — || align=right | 1.9 km || 
|-id=730 bgcolor=#E9E9E9
| 316730 ||  || — || September 13, 1998 || Kitt Peak || Spacewatch || — || align=right data-sort-value="0.69" | 690 m || 
|-id=731 bgcolor=#d6d6d6
| 316731 ||  || — || September 14, 1998 || Kitt Peak || Spacewatch || — || align=right | 3.0 km || 
|-id=732 bgcolor=#E9E9E9
| 316732 ||  || — || September 21, 1998 || Kitt Peak || Spacewatch || — || align=right | 1.2 km || 
|-id=733 bgcolor=#d6d6d6
| 316733 ||  || — || September 26, 1998 || Socorro || LINEAR || EMA || align=right | 4.0 km || 
|-id=734 bgcolor=#fefefe
| 316734 ||  || — || September 26, 1998 || Socorro || LINEAR || — || align=right | 1.0 km || 
|-id=735 bgcolor=#FA8072
| 316735 ||  || — || September 21, 1998 || Anderson Mesa || LONEOS || — || align=right | 1.4 km || 
|-id=736 bgcolor=#d6d6d6
| 316736 ||  || — || October 16, 1998 || Kitt Peak || Spacewatch || — || align=right | 4.0 km || 
|-id=737 bgcolor=#d6d6d6
| 316737 ||  || — || October 16, 1998 || Kitt Peak || Spacewatch || — || align=right | 3.7 km || 
|-id=738 bgcolor=#d6d6d6
| 316738 ||  || — || November 18, 1998 || Kitt Peak || Spacewatch || KOR || align=right | 1.3 km || 
|-id=739 bgcolor=#E9E9E9
| 316739 ||  || — || November 21, 1998 || Kitt Peak || Spacewatch || AGN || align=right | 1.4 km || 
|-id=740 bgcolor=#E9E9E9
| 316740 ||  || — || November 15, 1998 || Kitt Peak || Spacewatch || HEN || align=right | 1.4 km || 
|-id=741 bgcolor=#d6d6d6
| 316741 Janefletcher ||  ||  || November 17, 1998 || La Palma || A. Fitzsimmons || EUP || align=right | 5.0 km || 
|-id=742 bgcolor=#d6d6d6
| 316742 ||  || — || December 8, 1998 || Kitt Peak || Spacewatch || — || align=right | 3.5 km || 
|-id=743 bgcolor=#E9E9E9
| 316743 ||  || — || January 13, 1999 || Socorro || LINEAR || — || align=right | 2.9 km || 
|-id=744 bgcolor=#E9E9E9
| 316744 ||  || — || January 14, 1999 || Kitt Peak || Spacewatch || — || align=right | 1.5 km || 
|-id=745 bgcolor=#E9E9E9
| 316745 ||  || — || February 7, 1999 || Kitt Peak || Spacewatch || — || align=right | 2.6 km || 
|-id=746 bgcolor=#fefefe
| 316746 ||  || — || March 20, 1999 || Apache Point || SDSS || — || align=right data-sort-value="0.88" | 880 m || 
|-id=747 bgcolor=#d6d6d6
| 316747 ||  || — || March 21, 1999 || Apache Point || SDSS || — || align=right | 2.6 km || 
|-id=748 bgcolor=#E9E9E9
| 316748 ||  || — || April 12, 1999 || Kitt Peak || Spacewatch || — || align=right | 2.0 km || 
|-id=749 bgcolor=#E9E9E9
| 316749 ||  || — || May 8, 1999 || Catalina || CSS || — || align=right | 2.9 km || 
|-id=750 bgcolor=#E9E9E9
| 316750 ||  || — || May 10, 1999 || Socorro || LINEAR || — || align=right | 2.5 km || 
|-id=751 bgcolor=#E9E9E9
| 316751 ||  || — || May 12, 1999 || Socorro || LINEAR || — || align=right | 2.4 km || 
|-id=752 bgcolor=#fefefe
| 316752 ||  || — || August 21, 1999 || Kitt Peak || Spacewatch || — || align=right data-sort-value="0.57" | 570 m || 
|-id=753 bgcolor=#d6d6d6
| 316753 ||  || — || September 3, 1999 || Kitt Peak || Spacewatch || EOS || align=right | 2.5 km || 
|-id=754 bgcolor=#fefefe
| 316754 ||  || — || September 7, 1999 || Socorro || LINEAR || FLO || align=right | 1.0 km || 
|-id=755 bgcolor=#fefefe
| 316755 ||  || — || September 12, 1999 || Prescott || P. G. Comba || V || align=right data-sort-value="0.88" | 880 m || 
|-id=756 bgcolor=#fefefe
| 316756 ||  || — || September 13, 1999 || Promiod || G. A. Sala || FLO || align=right data-sort-value="0.85" | 850 m || 
|-id=757 bgcolor=#fefefe
| 316757 ||  || — || September 6, 1999 || Kitt Peak || Spacewatch || — || align=right | 1.1 km || 
|-id=758 bgcolor=#E9E9E9
| 316758 ||  || — || September 4, 1999 || Catalina || CSS || — || align=right | 3.3 km || 
|-id=759 bgcolor=#d6d6d6
| 316759 ||  || — || September 29, 1999 || Socorro || LINEAR || — || align=right | 5.2 km || 
|-id=760 bgcolor=#fefefe
| 316760 ||  || — || September 30, 1999 || Catalina || CSS || H || align=right data-sort-value="0.75" | 750 m || 
|-id=761 bgcolor=#d6d6d6
| 316761 ||  || — || October 3, 1999 || Kitt Peak || Spacewatch || NAE || align=right | 2.7 km || 
|-id=762 bgcolor=#fefefe
| 316762 ||  || — || October 4, 1999 || Socorro || LINEAR || V || align=right | 1.1 km || 
|-id=763 bgcolor=#d6d6d6
| 316763 ||  || — || October 2, 1999 || Kitt Peak || Spacewatch || THB || align=right | 3.1 km || 
|-id=764 bgcolor=#fefefe
| 316764 ||  || — || October 3, 1999 || Kitt Peak || Spacewatch || — || align=right data-sort-value="0.95" | 950 m || 
|-id=765 bgcolor=#d6d6d6
| 316765 ||  || — || October 3, 1999 || Kitt Peak || Spacewatch || URS || align=right | 3.4 km || 
|-id=766 bgcolor=#fefefe
| 316766 ||  || — || October 3, 1999 || Kitt Peak || Spacewatch || NYS || align=right data-sort-value="0.76" | 760 m || 
|-id=767 bgcolor=#d6d6d6
| 316767 ||  || — || October 4, 1999 || Kitt Peak || Spacewatch || HYG || align=right | 2.3 km || 
|-id=768 bgcolor=#fefefe
| 316768 ||  || — || October 4, 1999 || Kitt Peak || Spacewatch || — || align=right data-sort-value="0.98" | 980 m || 
|-id=769 bgcolor=#d6d6d6
| 316769 ||  || — || October 4, 1999 || Kitt Peak || Spacewatch || — || align=right | 2.9 km || 
|-id=770 bgcolor=#fefefe
| 316770 ||  || — || October 4, 1999 || Kitt Peak || Spacewatch || NYS || align=right data-sort-value="0.69" | 690 m || 
|-id=771 bgcolor=#fefefe
| 316771 ||  || — || October 6, 1999 || Kitt Peak || Spacewatch || CLA || align=right | 1.7 km || 
|-id=772 bgcolor=#d6d6d6
| 316772 ||  || — || October 9, 1999 || Kitt Peak || Spacewatch || — || align=right | 3.1 km || 
|-id=773 bgcolor=#fefefe
| 316773 ||  || — || October 10, 1999 || Kitt Peak || Spacewatch || NYS || align=right data-sort-value="0.69" | 690 m || 
|-id=774 bgcolor=#E9E9E9
| 316774 ||  || — || October 11, 1999 || Kitt Peak || Spacewatch || — || align=right | 3.3 km || 
|-id=775 bgcolor=#fefefe
| 316775 ||  || — || October 15, 1999 || Socorro || LINEAR || MAS || align=right | 1.1 km || 
|-id=776 bgcolor=#d6d6d6
| 316776 ||  || — || October 6, 1999 || Socorro || LINEAR || — || align=right | 3.8 km || 
|-id=777 bgcolor=#d6d6d6
| 316777 ||  || — || September 30, 1999 || Catalina || CSS || — || align=right | 3.5 km || 
|-id=778 bgcolor=#d6d6d6
| 316778 ||  || — || October 6, 1999 || Socorro || LINEAR || EOS || align=right | 2.6 km || 
|-id=779 bgcolor=#fefefe
| 316779 ||  || — || October 6, 1999 || Socorro || LINEAR || NYS || align=right data-sort-value="0.93" | 930 m || 
|-id=780 bgcolor=#fefefe
| 316780 ||  || — || October 7, 1999 || Socorro || LINEAR || MAS || align=right | 1.1 km || 
|-id=781 bgcolor=#FA8072
| 316781 ||  || — || October 7, 1999 || Socorro || LINEAR || — || align=right data-sort-value="0.77" | 770 m || 
|-id=782 bgcolor=#fefefe
| 316782 ||  || — || October 7, 1999 || Socorro || LINEAR || — || align=right | 1.3 km || 
|-id=783 bgcolor=#fefefe
| 316783 ||  || — || October 7, 1999 || Socorro || LINEAR || — || align=right | 1.1 km || 
|-id=784 bgcolor=#d6d6d6
| 316784 ||  || — || October 9, 1999 || Socorro || LINEAR || — || align=right | 3.9 km || 
|-id=785 bgcolor=#E9E9E9
| 316785 ||  || — || October 10, 1999 || Socorro || LINEAR || — || align=right | 1.5 km || 
|-id=786 bgcolor=#d6d6d6
| 316786 ||  || — || October 10, 1999 || Socorro || LINEAR || TIR || align=right | 3.5 km || 
|-id=787 bgcolor=#d6d6d6
| 316787 ||  || — || October 10, 1999 || Socorro || LINEAR || — || align=right | 3.4 km || 
|-id=788 bgcolor=#fefefe
| 316788 ||  || — || October 10, 1999 || Socorro || LINEAR || — || align=right data-sort-value="0.98" | 980 m || 
|-id=789 bgcolor=#d6d6d6
| 316789 ||  || — || October 10, 1999 || Socorro || LINEAR || — || align=right | 3.7 km || 
|-id=790 bgcolor=#d6d6d6
| 316790 ||  || — || October 12, 1999 || Socorro || LINEAR || — || align=right | 3.1 km || 
|-id=791 bgcolor=#fefefe
| 316791 ||  || — || October 13, 1999 || Socorro || LINEAR || NYS || align=right | 1.0 km || 
|-id=792 bgcolor=#d6d6d6
| 316792 ||  || — || October 6, 1999 || Socorro || LINEAR || — || align=right | 2.5 km || 
|-id=793 bgcolor=#fefefe
| 316793 ||  || — || October 4, 1999 || Kitt Peak || Spacewatch || — || align=right data-sort-value="0.85" | 850 m || 
|-id=794 bgcolor=#fefefe
| 316794 ||  || — || October 4, 1999 || Kitt Peak || Spacewatch || — || align=right data-sort-value="0.95" | 950 m || 
|-id=795 bgcolor=#E9E9E9
| 316795 ||  || — || October 6, 1999 || Socorro || LINEAR || — || align=right | 2.8 km || 
|-id=796 bgcolor=#fefefe
| 316796 ||  || — || October 11, 1999 || Kitt Peak || Spacewatch || — || align=right | 1.6 km || 
|-id=797 bgcolor=#d6d6d6
| 316797 ||  || — || October 9, 1999 || Socorro || LINEAR || — || align=right | 6.0 km || 
|-id=798 bgcolor=#d6d6d6
| 316798 ||  || — || October 3, 1999 || Kitt Peak || Spacewatch || — || align=right | 2.9 km || 
|-id=799 bgcolor=#E9E9E9
| 316799 ||  || — || October 29, 1999 || Catalina || CSS || — || align=right | 1.7 km || 
|-id=800 bgcolor=#fefefe
| 316800 ||  || — || October 30, 1999 || Kitt Peak || Spacewatch || V || align=right data-sort-value="0.74" | 740 m || 
|}

316801–316900 

|-bgcolor=#E9E9E9
| 316801 ||  || — || October 31, 1999 || Kitt Peak || Spacewatch || — || align=right | 2.3 km || 
|-id=802 bgcolor=#d6d6d6
| 316802 ||  || — || October 31, 1999 || Kitt Peak || Spacewatch || EOS || align=right | 2.6 km || 
|-id=803 bgcolor=#d6d6d6
| 316803 ||  || — || October 31, 1999 || Kitt Peak || Spacewatch || — || align=right | 3.2 km || 
|-id=804 bgcolor=#d6d6d6
| 316804 ||  || — || October 31, 1999 || Kitt Peak || Spacewatch || — || align=right | 2.7 km || 
|-id=805 bgcolor=#fefefe
| 316805 ||  || — || November 4, 1999 || Socorro || LINEAR || NYS || align=right data-sort-value="0.81" | 810 m || 
|-id=806 bgcolor=#fefefe
| 316806 ||  || — || November 1, 1999 || Kitt Peak || Spacewatch || V || align=right data-sort-value="0.73" | 730 m || 
|-id=807 bgcolor=#E9E9E9
| 316807 ||  || — || November 9, 1999 || Socorro || LINEAR || — || align=right | 2.3 km || 
|-id=808 bgcolor=#E9E9E9
| 316808 ||  || — || November 9, 1999 || Socorro || LINEAR || — || align=right | 1.6 km || 
|-id=809 bgcolor=#d6d6d6
| 316809 ||  || — || November 9, 1999 || Socorro || LINEAR || — || align=right | 3.5 km || 
|-id=810 bgcolor=#d6d6d6
| 316810 ||  || — || November 9, 1999 || Socorro || LINEAR || — || align=right | 4.2 km || 
|-id=811 bgcolor=#E9E9E9
| 316811 ||  || — || November 4, 1999 || Kitt Peak || Spacewatch || — || align=right | 1.9 km || 
|-id=812 bgcolor=#d6d6d6
| 316812 ||  || — || November 11, 1999 || Kitt Peak || Spacewatch || EOS || align=right | 3.4 km || 
|-id=813 bgcolor=#fefefe
| 316813 ||  || — || November 14, 1999 || Socorro || LINEAR || — || align=right data-sort-value="0.95" | 950 m || 
|-id=814 bgcolor=#fefefe
| 316814 ||  || — || November 14, 1999 || Socorro || LINEAR || — || align=right | 2.3 km || 
|-id=815 bgcolor=#fefefe
| 316815 ||  || — || November 14, 1999 || Socorro || LINEAR || — || align=right | 1.1 km || 
|-id=816 bgcolor=#d6d6d6
| 316816 ||  || — || October 6, 1999 || Socorro || LINEAR || — || align=right | 3.5 km || 
|-id=817 bgcolor=#d6d6d6
| 316817 ||  || — || November 12, 1999 || Socorro || LINEAR || — || align=right | 2.9 km || 
|-id=818 bgcolor=#E9E9E9
| 316818 ||  || — || November 14, 1999 || Socorro || LINEAR || — || align=right | 2.9 km || 
|-id=819 bgcolor=#d6d6d6
| 316819 ||  || — || November 3, 1999 || Socorro || LINEAR || LIX || align=right | 3.5 km || 
|-id=820 bgcolor=#d6d6d6
| 316820 ||  || — || November 1, 1999 || Kitt Peak || Spacewatch || — || align=right | 3.8 km || 
|-id=821 bgcolor=#d6d6d6
| 316821 ||  || — || October 6, 1999 || Socorro || LINEAR || — || align=right | 3.3 km || 
|-id=822 bgcolor=#d6d6d6
| 316822 ||  || — || November 29, 1999 || Kitt Peak || Spacewatch || — || align=right | 2.8 km || 
|-id=823 bgcolor=#fefefe
| 316823 ||  || — || November 29, 1999 || Kitt Peak || Spacewatch || EUT || align=right data-sort-value="0.81" | 810 m || 
|-id=824 bgcolor=#E9E9E9
| 316824 ||  || — || December 7, 1999 || Socorro || LINEAR || — || align=right | 1.7 km || 
|-id=825 bgcolor=#fefefe
| 316825 ||  || — || December 8, 1999 || Kitt Peak || Spacewatch || — || align=right data-sort-value="0.87" | 870 m || 
|-id=826 bgcolor=#d6d6d6
| 316826 ||  || — || December 8, 1999 || Kitt Peak || Spacewatch || EOS || align=right | 2.7 km || 
|-id=827 bgcolor=#fefefe
| 316827 ||  || — || December 13, 1999 || Kitt Peak || Spacewatch || FLO || align=right data-sort-value="0.79" | 790 m || 
|-id=828 bgcolor=#d6d6d6
| 316828 ||  || — || December 5, 1999 || Catalina || CSS || TIR || align=right | 4.1 km || 
|-id=829 bgcolor=#FA8072
| 316829 ||  || — || December 16, 1999 || Socorro || LINEAR || — || align=right | 3.4 km || 
|-id=830 bgcolor=#d6d6d6
| 316830 ||  || — || January 7, 2000 || Socorro || LINEAR || EUP || align=right | 5.6 km || 
|-id=831 bgcolor=#E9E9E9
| 316831 ||  || — || January 26, 2000 || Kitt Peak || Spacewatch || — || align=right | 3.1 km || 
|-id=832 bgcolor=#d6d6d6
| 316832 ||  || — || January 26, 2000 || Kitt Peak || Spacewatch || — || align=right | 2.6 km || 
|-id=833 bgcolor=#C2FFFF
| 316833 ||  || — || January 27, 2000 || Kitt Peak || Spacewatch || L4 || align=right | 9.2 km || 
|-id=834 bgcolor=#d6d6d6
| 316834 ||  || — || February 8, 2000 || Kitt Peak || Spacewatch || THM || align=right | 2.4 km || 
|-id=835 bgcolor=#C2FFFF
| 316835 ||  || — || January 28, 2000 || Kitt Peak || Spacewatch || L4 || align=right | 10 km || 
|-id=836 bgcolor=#d6d6d6
| 316836 ||  || — || February 4, 2000 || Kitt Peak || Spacewatch || — || align=right | 2.7 km || 
|-id=837 bgcolor=#fefefe
| 316837 ||  || — || February 6, 2000 || Kitt Peak || Spacewatch || — || align=right data-sort-value="0.82" | 820 m || 
|-id=838 bgcolor=#d6d6d6
| 316838 ||  || — || February 3, 2000 || Kitt Peak || Spacewatch || KOR || align=right | 1.6 km || 
|-id=839 bgcolor=#d6d6d6
| 316839 ||  || — || February 26, 2000 || Kitt Peak || Spacewatch || K-2 || align=right | 1.8 km || 
|-id=840 bgcolor=#E9E9E9
| 316840 ||  || — || February 27, 2000 || Kitt Peak || Spacewatch || — || align=right | 1.6 km || 
|-id=841 bgcolor=#fefefe
| 316841 ||  || — || February 27, 2000 || Kitt Peak || Spacewatch || — || align=right | 1.1 km || 
|-id=842 bgcolor=#E9E9E9
| 316842 ||  || — || March 12, 2000 || Kitt Peak || Spacewatch || — || align=right | 1.8 km || 
|-id=843 bgcolor=#E9E9E9
| 316843 ||  || — || March 11, 2000 || Anderson Mesa || LONEOS || — || align=right | 1.2 km || 
|-id=844 bgcolor=#fefefe
| 316844 ||  || — || March 5, 2000 || Socorro || LINEAR || FLO || align=right data-sort-value="0.98" | 980 m || 
|-id=845 bgcolor=#fefefe
| 316845 ||  || — || March 25, 2000 || Kitt Peak || Spacewatch || — || align=right data-sort-value="0.78" | 780 m || 
|-id=846 bgcolor=#E9E9E9
| 316846 ||  || — || March 26, 2000 || Anderson Mesa || LONEOS || BRG || align=right | 2.1 km || 
|-id=847 bgcolor=#fefefe
| 316847 ||  || — || April 5, 2000 || Socorro || LINEAR || NYS || align=right data-sort-value="0.93" | 930 m || 
|-id=848 bgcolor=#E9E9E9
| 316848 ||  || — || April 5, 2000 || Socorro || LINEAR || — || align=right data-sort-value="0.99" | 990 m || 
|-id=849 bgcolor=#E9E9E9
| 316849 ||  || — || April 5, 2000 || Socorro || LINEAR || — || align=right | 1.4 km || 
|-id=850 bgcolor=#d6d6d6
| 316850 ||  || — || April 5, 2000 || Kitt Peak || Spacewatch || — || align=right | 3.1 km || 
|-id=851 bgcolor=#E9E9E9
| 316851 ||  || — || April 6, 2000 || Kitt Peak || Spacewatch || — || align=right | 2.5 km || 
|-id=852 bgcolor=#E9E9E9
| 316852 ||  || — || April 10, 2000 || Kitt Peak || Spacewatch || — || align=right | 1.3 km || 
|-id=853 bgcolor=#fefefe
| 316853 ||  || — || April 27, 2000 || Socorro || LINEAR || — || align=right | 1.3 km || 
|-id=854 bgcolor=#E9E9E9
| 316854 ||  || — || April 29, 2000 || Socorro || LINEAR || — || align=right | 1.4 km || 
|-id=855 bgcolor=#FA8072
| 316855 ||  || — || May 1, 2000 || Kitt Peak || Spacewatch || — || align=right | 5.8 km || 
|-id=856 bgcolor=#E9E9E9
| 316856 ||  || — || May 4, 2000 || Kitt Peak || Spacewatch || MAR || align=right | 1.3 km || 
|-id=857 bgcolor=#FA8072
| 316857 ||  || — || July 6, 2000 || Anderson Mesa || LONEOS || — || align=right | 1.1 km || 
|-id=858 bgcolor=#fefefe
| 316858 ||  || — || August 4, 2000 || Socorro || LINEAR || H || align=right data-sort-value="0.77" | 770 m || 
|-id=859 bgcolor=#E9E9E9
| 316859 ||  || — || August 24, 2000 || Socorro || LINEAR || — || align=right | 3.2 km || 
|-id=860 bgcolor=#E9E9E9
| 316860 ||  || — || August 24, 2000 || Socorro || LINEAR || MAR || align=right | 1.5 km || 
|-id=861 bgcolor=#E9E9E9
| 316861 ||  || — || August 24, 2000 || Socorro || LINEAR || EUN || align=right | 1.8 km || 
|-id=862 bgcolor=#E9E9E9
| 316862 ||  || — || August 26, 2000 || Socorro || LINEAR || — || align=right | 2.4 km || 
|-id=863 bgcolor=#fefefe
| 316863 ||  || — || August 26, 2000 || Socorro || LINEAR || H || align=right | 1.1 km || 
|-id=864 bgcolor=#fefefe
| 316864 ||  || — || August 24, 2000 || Socorro || LINEAR || FLO || align=right data-sort-value="0.80" | 800 m || 
|-id=865 bgcolor=#fefefe
| 316865 ||  || — || August 24, 2000 || Socorro || LINEAR || NYS || align=right data-sort-value="0.81" | 810 m || 
|-id=866 bgcolor=#FA8072
| 316866 ||  || — || August 26, 2000 || Socorro || LINEAR || — || align=right | 1.1 km || 
|-id=867 bgcolor=#fefefe
| 316867 ||  || — || August 31, 2000 || Socorro || LINEAR || — || align=right data-sort-value="0.98" | 980 m || 
|-id=868 bgcolor=#fefefe
| 316868 ||  || — || August 31, 2000 || Socorro || LINEAR || H || align=right data-sort-value="0.76" | 760 m || 
|-id=869 bgcolor=#fefefe
| 316869 ||  || — || August 29, 2000 || Socorro || LINEAR || — || align=right | 1.2 km || 
|-id=870 bgcolor=#FA8072
| 316870 ||  || — || August 31, 2000 || Socorro || LINEAR || — || align=right data-sort-value="0.96" | 960 m || 
|-id=871 bgcolor=#FA8072
| 316871 ||  || — || August 31, 2000 || Socorro || LINEAR || H || align=right data-sort-value="0.78" | 780 m || 
|-id=872 bgcolor=#E9E9E9
| 316872 ||  || — || August 26, 2000 || Socorro || LINEAR || — || align=right | 3.4 km || 
|-id=873 bgcolor=#E9E9E9
| 316873 ||  || — || August 24, 2000 || Socorro || LINEAR || — || align=right | 2.7 km || 
|-id=874 bgcolor=#fefefe
| 316874 ||  || — || August 31, 2000 || Socorro || LINEAR || FLO || align=right data-sort-value="0.77" | 770 m || 
|-id=875 bgcolor=#fefefe
| 316875 ||  || — || September 1, 2000 || Socorro || LINEAR || — || align=right | 2.0 km || 
|-id=876 bgcolor=#FA8072
| 316876 ||  || — || September 3, 2000 || Socorro || LINEAR || — || align=right | 4.3 km || 
|-id=877 bgcolor=#E9E9E9
| 316877 ||  || — || September 2, 2000 || Socorro || LINEAR || — || align=right | 1.5 km || 
|-id=878 bgcolor=#fefefe
| 316878 ||  || — || September 3, 2000 || Socorro || LINEAR || — || align=right | 1.2 km || 
|-id=879 bgcolor=#fefefe
| 316879 ||  || — || September 4, 2000 || Anderson Mesa || LONEOS || — || align=right data-sort-value="0.98" | 980 m || 
|-id=880 bgcolor=#d6d6d6
| 316880 ||  || — || September 3, 2000 || Apache Point || SDSS || KOR || align=right | 1.9 km || 
|-id=881 bgcolor=#E9E9E9
| 316881 ||  || — || September 23, 2000 || Socorro || LINEAR || — || align=right | 2.7 km || 
|-id=882 bgcolor=#E9E9E9
| 316882 ||  || — || September 23, 2000 || Socorro || LINEAR || — || align=right | 3.0 km || 
|-id=883 bgcolor=#FA8072
| 316883 ||  || — || September 24, 2000 || Socorro || LINEAR || — || align=right | 2.7 km || 
|-id=884 bgcolor=#fefefe
| 316884 ||  || — || September 26, 2000 || Socorro || LINEAR || H || align=right | 1.0 km || 
|-id=885 bgcolor=#d6d6d6
| 316885 ||  || — || September 23, 2000 || Socorro || LINEAR || — || align=right | 2.9 km || 
|-id=886 bgcolor=#fefefe
| 316886 ||  || — || September 24, 2000 || Socorro || LINEAR || NYS || align=right data-sort-value="0.91" | 910 m || 
|-id=887 bgcolor=#E9E9E9
| 316887 ||  || — || September 24, 2000 || Socorro || LINEAR || DOR || align=right | 3.0 km || 
|-id=888 bgcolor=#E9E9E9
| 316888 ||  || — || September 23, 2000 || Socorro || LINEAR || — || align=right | 4.4 km || 
|-id=889 bgcolor=#E9E9E9
| 316889 ||  || — || September 24, 2000 || Socorro || LINEAR || — || align=right | 1.3 km || 
|-id=890 bgcolor=#E9E9E9
| 316890 ||  || — || September 24, 2000 || Socorro || LINEAR || — || align=right | 1.0 km || 
|-id=891 bgcolor=#fefefe
| 316891 ||  || — || September 24, 2000 || Socorro || LINEAR || NYS || align=right data-sort-value="0.95" | 950 m || 
|-id=892 bgcolor=#d6d6d6
| 316892 ||  || — || September 23, 2000 || Socorro || LINEAR || — || align=right | 2.9 km || 
|-id=893 bgcolor=#E9E9E9
| 316893 ||  || — || September 23, 2000 || Socorro || LINEAR || — || align=right | 1.8 km || 
|-id=894 bgcolor=#E9E9E9
| 316894 ||  || — || September 23, 2000 || Socorro || LINEAR || — || align=right | 2.4 km || 
|-id=895 bgcolor=#E9E9E9
| 316895 ||  || — || September 23, 2000 || Socorro || LINEAR || — || align=right | 2.6 km || 
|-id=896 bgcolor=#E9E9E9
| 316896 ||  || — || September 23, 2000 || Socorro || LINEAR || — || align=right | 3.0 km || 
|-id=897 bgcolor=#E9E9E9
| 316897 ||  || — || September 23, 2000 || Kitt Peak || Spacewatch || — || align=right | 2.9 km || 
|-id=898 bgcolor=#E9E9E9
| 316898 ||  || — || September 24, 2000 || Socorro || LINEAR || — || align=right | 3.1 km || 
|-id=899 bgcolor=#E9E9E9
| 316899 ||  || — || September 26, 2000 || Socorro || LINEAR || — || align=right | 3.0 km || 
|-id=900 bgcolor=#fefefe
| 316900 ||  || — || September 27, 2000 || Socorro || LINEAR || H || align=right data-sort-value="0.83" | 830 m || 
|}

316901–317000 

|-bgcolor=#fefefe
| 316901 ||  || — || September 28, 2000 || Socorro || LINEAR || FLO || align=right data-sort-value="0.84" | 840 m || 
|-id=902 bgcolor=#E9E9E9
| 316902 ||  || — || September 23, 2000 || Socorro || LINEAR || — || align=right | 3.8 km || 
|-id=903 bgcolor=#fefefe
| 316903 ||  || — || September 27, 2000 || Socorro || LINEAR || — || align=right data-sort-value="0.90" | 900 m || 
|-id=904 bgcolor=#fefefe
| 316904 ||  || — || September 27, 2000 || Socorro || LINEAR || FLO || align=right data-sort-value="0.79" | 790 m || 
|-id=905 bgcolor=#fefefe
| 316905 ||  || — || September 19, 2000 || Haleakala || NEAT || — || align=right data-sort-value="0.83" | 830 m || 
|-id=906 bgcolor=#d6d6d6
| 316906 ||  || — || October 2, 2000 || OCA-Anza || M. Collins, R. Sipe || — || align=right | 3.2 km || 
|-id=907 bgcolor=#fefefe
| 316907 ||  || — || October 1, 2000 || Socorro || LINEAR || FLO || align=right | 1.0 km || 
|-id=908 bgcolor=#fefefe
| 316908 ||  || — || September 24, 2000 || Socorro || LINEAR || — || align=right data-sort-value="0.98" | 980 m || 
|-id=909 bgcolor=#fefefe
| 316909 ||  || — || October 1, 2000 || Socorro || LINEAR || FLO || align=right data-sort-value="0.80" | 800 m || 
|-id=910 bgcolor=#E9E9E9
| 316910 ||  || — || October 24, 2000 || Socorro || LINEAR || — || align=right | 1.4 km || 
|-id=911 bgcolor=#fefefe
| 316911 ||  || — || October 25, 2000 || Socorro || LINEAR || — || align=right | 1.8 km || 
|-id=912 bgcolor=#fefefe
| 316912 ||  || — || October 24, 2000 || Socorro || LINEAR || — || align=right | 1.1 km || 
|-id=913 bgcolor=#d6d6d6
| 316913 ||  || — || October 24, 2000 || Socorro || LINEAR || — || align=right | 4.4 km || 
|-id=914 bgcolor=#fefefe
| 316914 ||  || — || October 25, 2000 || Socorro || LINEAR || — || align=right data-sort-value="0.74" | 740 m || 
|-id=915 bgcolor=#fefefe
| 316915 ||  || — || October 30, 2000 || Socorro || LINEAR || — || align=right | 1.1 km || 
|-id=916 bgcolor=#fefefe
| 316916 ||  || — || November 1, 2000 || Socorro || LINEAR || — || align=right | 1.0 km || 
|-id=917 bgcolor=#fefefe
| 316917 ||  || — || November 1, 2000 || Socorro || LINEAR || V || align=right | 1.0 km || 
|-id=918 bgcolor=#fefefe
| 316918 ||  || — || November 21, 2000 || Socorro || LINEAR || — || align=right | 1.1 km || 
|-id=919 bgcolor=#E9E9E9
| 316919 ||  || — || November 20, 2000 || Socorro || LINEAR || — || align=right | 2.5 km || 
|-id=920 bgcolor=#fefefe
| 316920 ||  || — || November 20, 2000 || Socorro || LINEAR || FLO || align=right data-sort-value="0.75" | 750 m || 
|-id=921 bgcolor=#E9E9E9
| 316921 ||  || — || November 27, 2000 || Socorro || LINEAR || — || align=right | 1.6 km || 
|-id=922 bgcolor=#FA8072
| 316922 ||  || — || November 22, 2000 || Haleakala || NEAT || — || align=right | 5.8 km || 
|-id=923 bgcolor=#fefefe
| 316923 ||  || — || December 15, 2000 || Socorro || LINEAR || PHO || align=right | 1.4 km || 
|-id=924 bgcolor=#fefefe
| 316924 ||  || — || December 19, 2000 || Socorro || LINEAR || PHO || align=right | 1.3 km || 
|-id=925 bgcolor=#fefefe
| 316925 ||  || — || December 28, 2000 || Socorro || LINEAR || — || align=right | 1.5 km || 
|-id=926 bgcolor=#E9E9E9
| 316926 ||  || — || December 30, 2000 || Socorro || LINEAR || — || align=right | 1.7 km || 
|-id=927 bgcolor=#fefefe
| 316927 ||  || — || December 30, 2000 || Socorro || LINEAR || — || align=right | 1.5 km || 
|-id=928 bgcolor=#d6d6d6
| 316928 ||  || — || December 30, 2000 || Socorro || LINEAR || — || align=right | 2.6 km || 
|-id=929 bgcolor=#d6d6d6
| 316929 ||  || — || December 30, 2000 || Socorro || LINEAR || — || align=right | 4.2 km || 
|-id=930 bgcolor=#d6d6d6
| 316930 ||  || — || December 30, 2000 || Socorro || LINEAR || — || align=right | 4.4 km || 
|-id=931 bgcolor=#d6d6d6
| 316931 ||  || — || January 1, 2001 || Kitt Peak || Spacewatch || — || align=right | 2.9 km || 
|-id=932 bgcolor=#fefefe
| 316932 ||  || — || January 2, 2001 || Socorro || LINEAR || — || align=right | 1.1 km || 
|-id=933 bgcolor=#d6d6d6
| 316933 ||  || — || January 15, 2001 || Kitt Peak || Spacewatch || EOS || align=right | 3.1 km || 
|-id=934 bgcolor=#FA8072
| 316934 ||  || — || January 5, 2001 || Socorro || LINEAR || — || align=right | 1.2 km || 
|-id=935 bgcolor=#fefefe
| 316935 ||  || — || January 19, 2001 || Socorro || LINEAR || H || align=right data-sort-value="0.67" | 670 m || 
|-id=936 bgcolor=#E9E9E9
| 316936 ||  || — || January 21, 2001 || Kitt Peak || Spacewatch || — || align=right | 1.5 km || 
|-id=937 bgcolor=#fefefe
| 316937 ||  || — || January 26, 2001 || Kitt Peak || Spacewatch || MAS || align=right data-sort-value="0.69" | 690 m || 
|-id=938 bgcolor=#fefefe
| 316938 ||  || — || February 3, 2001 || Socorro || LINEAR || H || align=right data-sort-value="0.65" | 650 m || 
|-id=939 bgcolor=#fefefe
| 316939 ||  || — || February 4, 2001 || Socorro || LINEAR || PHO || align=right | 1.6 km || 
|-id=940 bgcolor=#d6d6d6
| 316940 ||  || — || February 13, 2001 || Socorro || LINEAR || EUP || align=right | 4.8 km || 
|-id=941 bgcolor=#d6d6d6
| 316941 ||  || — || February 15, 2001 || Socorro || LINEAR || — || align=right | 4.7 km || 
|-id=942 bgcolor=#d6d6d6
| 316942 ||  || — || February 1, 2001 || Anderson Mesa || LONEOS || — || align=right | 3.7 km || 
|-id=943 bgcolor=#d6d6d6
| 316943 ||  || — || February 16, 2001 || Kitt Peak || Spacewatch || — || align=right | 2.0 km || 
|-id=944 bgcolor=#fefefe
| 316944 ||  || — || February 16, 2001 || Socorro || LINEAR || — || align=right | 1.1 km || 
|-id=945 bgcolor=#d6d6d6
| 316945 ||  || — || February 17, 2001 || Kitt Peak || Spacewatch || — || align=right | 3.9 km || 
|-id=946 bgcolor=#fefefe
| 316946 ||  || — || February 16, 2001 || Socorro || LINEAR || — || align=right | 1.1 km || 
|-id=947 bgcolor=#fefefe
| 316947 ||  || — || February 16, 2001 || Socorro || LINEAR || — || align=right data-sort-value="0.92" | 920 m || 
|-id=948 bgcolor=#d6d6d6
| 316948 ||  || — || February 16, 2001 || Socorro || LINEAR || EUP || align=right | 4.4 km || 
|-id=949 bgcolor=#d6d6d6
| 316949 ||  || — || February 16, 2001 || Socorro || LINEAR || — || align=right | 5.3 km || 
|-id=950 bgcolor=#fefefe
| 316950 ||  || — || January 3, 2001 || Socorro || LINEAR || — || align=right | 1.2 km || 
|-id=951 bgcolor=#d6d6d6
| 316951 ||  || — || February 19, 2001 || Nogales || Tenagra II Obs. || EOS || align=right | 2.6 km || 
|-id=952 bgcolor=#d6d6d6
| 316952 ||  || — || February 19, 2001 || Socorro || LINEAR || — || align=right | 4.7 km || 
|-id=953 bgcolor=#d6d6d6
| 316953 ||  || — || February 22, 2001 || Nogales || Tenagra II Obs. || — || align=right | 4.8 km || 
|-id=954 bgcolor=#d6d6d6
| 316954 ||  || — || February 21, 2001 || Kitt Peak || Spacewatch || EOS || align=right | 2.1 km || 
|-id=955 bgcolor=#d6d6d6
| 316955 ||  || — || February 27, 2001 || Kitt Peak || Spacewatch || — || align=right | 4.7 km || 
|-id=956 bgcolor=#fefefe
| 316956 ||  || — || February 22, 2001 || Kitt Peak || Spacewatch || NYS || align=right data-sort-value="0.65" | 650 m || 
|-id=957 bgcolor=#fefefe
| 316957 ||  || — || March 15, 2001 || Kitt Peak || Spacewatch || — || align=right | 1.0 km || 
|-id=958 bgcolor=#E9E9E9
| 316958 ||  || — || March 18, 2001 || Junk Bond || D. Healy || — || align=right | 2.1 km || 
|-id=959 bgcolor=#fefefe
| 316959 ||  || — || March 19, 2001 || Anderson Mesa || LONEOS || — || align=right | 1.2 km || 
|-id=960 bgcolor=#fefefe
| 316960 ||  || — || March 18, 2001 || Socorro || LINEAR || — || align=right | 1.4 km || 
|-id=961 bgcolor=#E9E9E9
| 316961 ||  || — || March 21, 2001 || Haleakala || NEAT || — || align=right | 4.2 km || 
|-id=962 bgcolor=#d6d6d6
| 316962 ||  || — || March 21, 2001 || Anderson Mesa || LONEOS || EUP || align=right | 5.6 km || 
|-id=963 bgcolor=#d6d6d6
| 316963 ||  || — || February 24, 2001 || Haleakala || NEAT || — || align=right | 4.2 km || 
|-id=964 bgcolor=#d6d6d6
| 316964 ||  || — || March 19, 2001 || Socorro || LINEAR || — || align=right | 4.3 km || 
|-id=965 bgcolor=#d6d6d6
| 316965 ||  || — || March 19, 2001 || Socorro || LINEAR || TIR || align=right | 3.7 km || 
|-id=966 bgcolor=#d6d6d6
| 316966 ||  || — || March 19, 2001 || Socorro || LINEAR || — || align=right | 4.2 km || 
|-id=967 bgcolor=#fefefe
| 316967 ||  || — || March 23, 2001 || Socorro || LINEAR || — || align=right data-sort-value="0.92" | 920 m || 
|-id=968 bgcolor=#d6d6d6
| 316968 ||  || — || March 23, 2001 || Socorro || LINEAR || TIR || align=right | 4.0 km || 
|-id=969 bgcolor=#d6d6d6
| 316969 ||  || — || March 26, 2001 || Kitt Peak || Spacewatch || EOS || align=right | 2.7 km || 
|-id=970 bgcolor=#fefefe
| 316970 ||  || — || March 26, 2001 || Socorro || LINEAR || — || align=right | 1.1 km || 
|-id=971 bgcolor=#fefefe
| 316971 ||  || — || March 29, 2001 || Socorro || LINEAR || — || align=right | 1.3 km || 
|-id=972 bgcolor=#d6d6d6
| 316972 ||  || — || March 20, 2001 || Haleakala || NEAT || URS || align=right | 4.5 km || 
|-id=973 bgcolor=#fefefe
| 316973 ||  || — || March 22, 2001 || Kitt Peak || Spacewatch || V || align=right data-sort-value="0.71" | 710 m || 
|-id=974 bgcolor=#fefefe
| 316974 ||  || — || March 24, 2001 || Anderson Mesa || LONEOS || — || align=right | 3.3 km || 
|-id=975 bgcolor=#d6d6d6
| 316975 ||  || — || March 22, 2001 || Cima Ekar || Asiago Obs. || EOS || align=right | 2.4 km || 
|-id=976 bgcolor=#fefefe
| 316976 ||  || — || March 29, 2001 || Anderson Mesa || LONEOS || — || align=right data-sort-value="0.91" | 910 m || 
|-id=977 bgcolor=#fefefe
| 316977 ||  || — || March 29, 2001 || Anderson Mesa || LONEOS || — || align=right | 1.0 km || 
|-id=978 bgcolor=#d6d6d6
| 316978 ||  || — || March 20, 2001 || Anderson Mesa || LONEOS || — || align=right | 4.3 km || 
|-id=979 bgcolor=#d6d6d6
| 316979 ||  || — || March 26, 2001 || Kitt Peak || M. W. Buie || EOS || align=right | 1.9 km || 
|-id=980 bgcolor=#d6d6d6
| 316980 ||  || — || April 15, 2001 || Socorro || LINEAR || EUP || align=right | 5.7 km || 
|-id=981 bgcolor=#d6d6d6
| 316981 ||  || — || April 15, 2001 || Socorro || LINEAR || — || align=right | 5.6 km || 
|-id=982 bgcolor=#d6d6d6
| 316982 ||  || — || April 21, 2001 || Socorro || LINEAR || EUP || align=right | 4.6 km || 
|-id=983 bgcolor=#fefefe
| 316983 ||  || — || April 25, 2001 || Anderson Mesa || LONEOS || H || align=right data-sort-value="0.92" | 920 m || 
|-id=984 bgcolor=#fefefe
| 316984 ||  || — || May 2, 2001 || Socorro || LINEAR || — || align=right | 1.1 km || 
|-id=985 bgcolor=#d6d6d6
| 316985 ||  || — || May 20, 2001 || Haleakala || NEAT || EUP || align=right | 6.9 km || 
|-id=986 bgcolor=#d6d6d6
| 316986 ||  || — || June 12, 2001 || Kitt Peak || Spacewatch || 7:4 || align=right | 5.0 km || 
|-id=987 bgcolor=#d6d6d6
| 316987 ||  || — || June 12, 2001 || Kitt Peak || Spacewatch || 7:4 || align=right | 3.8 km || 
|-id=988 bgcolor=#E9E9E9
| 316988 ||  || — || June 15, 2001 || Socorro || LINEAR || EUN || align=right | 2.2 km || 
|-id=989 bgcolor=#E9E9E9
| 316989 ||  || — || July 13, 2001 || Palomar || NEAT || WIT || align=right | 1.4 km || 
|-id=990 bgcolor=#E9E9E9
| 316990 ||  || — || July 14, 2001 || Haleakala || NEAT || — || align=right | 2.2 km || 
|-id=991 bgcolor=#E9E9E9
| 316991 ||  || — || July 17, 2001 || Palomar || NEAT || — || align=right | 2.3 km || 
|-id=992 bgcolor=#E9E9E9
| 316992 ||  || — || July 18, 2001 || Palomar || NEAT || — || align=right | 1.3 km || 
|-id=993 bgcolor=#E9E9E9
| 316993 ||  || — || July 22, 2001 || Palomar || NEAT || — || align=right | 2.7 km || 
|-id=994 bgcolor=#E9E9E9
| 316994 ||  || — || July 24, 2001 || Palomar || NEAT || — || align=right | 1.4 km || 
|-id=995 bgcolor=#E9E9E9
| 316995 ||  || — || July 20, 2001 || Palomar || NEAT || — || align=right | 1.3 km || 
|-id=996 bgcolor=#E9E9E9
| 316996 ||  || — || July 25, 2001 || Haleakala || NEAT || KON || align=right | 3.1 km || 
|-id=997 bgcolor=#E9E9E9
| 316997 ||  || — || July 27, 2001 || Anderson Mesa || LONEOS || — || align=right | 2.9 km || 
|-id=998 bgcolor=#fefefe
| 316998 ||  || — || August 10, 2001 || Palomar || NEAT || V || align=right data-sort-value="0.98" | 980 m || 
|-id=999 bgcolor=#fefefe
| 316999 ||  || — || August 10, 2001 || Haleakala || NEAT || — || align=right data-sort-value="0.89" | 890 m || 
|-id=000 bgcolor=#E9E9E9
| 317000 ||  || — || August 13, 2001 || San Marcello || A. Boattini, M. Tombelli || JUN || align=right | 1.6 km || 
|}

References

External links 
 Discovery Circumstances: Numbered Minor Planets (315001)–(320000) (IAU Minor Planet Center)

0316